This is a list of locality names and populated place names in the state of Victoria, Australia, outside the Melbourne metropolitan area. It is organised by region from the south-west of the state to the east and, for convenience, is sectioned by Local Government Area (LGA). Localities are bounded areas recorded on VICNAMES, although boundaries are the responsibility of each council. Many localities cross LGA boundaries, some being partly within three LGAs, but are listed here once under the LGA in which the major population centre or area occurs.

The Office of Geographic Names (OGN), led by the Registrar of Geographic Names, administers the naming or renaming of localities (as well as roads, and other features) in Victoria, and maintains the Register of Geographic Names, referred as the VICNAMES register, pursuant to the Geographic Place Names Act 1998. The OGN has issued the mandatory Naming rules for places in Victoria, Statutory requirements for naming roads, features and localities – 2016 (naming rules), which took effect on 2 February 2017, and which are based on national standards and policies in naming of such places. Detailed maps showing locality boundaries within a LGA are available on the Land Victoria website.

Introduction
Although the names of localities may in some cases be the same as parishes (surveyed cadastral divisions), their boundaries often differ. For instance the locality of Tyrendarra contains part of the parish of Narrawong to the west of the Fitzroy River, due to the township being established on the western border of the parish and postal services etc.to that area being supplied from Tyrendarra (the first two subscribers to the telephone service in 1925 were resident in the parish of Narrawong). The locality of Tyrendarra East also lies within the parish.

Bracketed behind locality names are the names of official neighbourhoods (unbounded areas listed by the Registrar of Geographic Names) that lie generally within the locality. The locality of Ouyen contains eighteen neighbourhoods, five of which once had a railway station and fourteen of which once had a post office. The amalgamation of farm properties, the consequent reduced population, closure of postal and railway facilities has led to the amalgamation of erstwhile localities, although those living there would not consider themselves to be living in Ouyen and their mail would still be addressed accordingly. In contrast, those living in the neighbourhood of Narrawong East would all give their address as Tyrendarra. The reason for the existence of the named neighbourhood was the State School (now closed) of the same name, nearer to Tyrendarra township than the Tyrendarra school, but within Narrawong parish and named accordingly. This is borne out by the official coordinates being those of the school. The list of neighbourhoods, with geographic coordinates, are available from Land Victoria.

Also bracketed are earlier names (or alternative official spellings or style) for a locality; few names have changed once established but Boggy Creek, Muddy Creek and Cannibal Creek gained more respectable names when a township was surveyed. The removal of the possessive apostrophe in place names is not recorded, but the more recent possessive to adjectival changes are (Darlot's Creek became Darlots Creek and later Darlot Creek).

Names from the extended postcode (mail destination) list are included. When the new Australian postcode system was introduced in Victoria in 1967 all mail destinations  were assigned postcodes based on the mail routing. Many localities share postcodes with nearby localities; some named localities have two or three different postcodes because different mail routes traversed their area. Postcodes were assigned outside the (then) metropolitan area along radial lines from Melbourne, from towards the south-west to towards the south-east numbered from 3211 to 3996 in a clockwise direction.

The names of all Post Offices/Receiving Offices (PO/RO), Telegraph/Telephone Offices (TO) open at any time in Victoria have been recorded by Phoenix Auctions History and where the location is accurately known, and where the name of the office is not simply the surname of the operator of the facility, its name has been included.

For (linked) localities with Wikipedia articles further information on the bracketed names may be expected within the articles. For those lacking articles the range of years the locality (or a bracketed area) had a post, telegraph or telephone office are recorded as an approximation of the establishment of the locality as a populated entity, and as some indication of its life as a viable community.

All names italicised have never had a post or telegraph office open under the exact name (apostrophisation excluded).

Shire of Glenelg

Allestree  Bahgallah (1878–1977)  Bolwarra (1902–1907 see Allestree)  Breakaway Creek (1937–1963 see Condah)  Brimboal (1873–1957)  Cape Bridgewater (Bridgewater Lower, Lower Cape Bridgewater)  Carapook (?–?)  Cashmore (1913–1973 Cashmore Heath)  Casterton (The Glenelg)  Condah (Condah Swamp)  Corndale (Heath Field)  Dartmoor (Woodford Inn)  Digby (1858– Myaring, Rifle Downs)  Drik Drik (1872–1971)  Drumborg (1889–1957 Sinclair, West Sinclair)  Dunrobin (1912–1967)  Dutton Way (see Portland)  Gorae (1904–1975)  Gorae West (1913–1957 Curries)  Grassdale (1885–1969 Miakite)  Greenwald (1884–1971 Greenwald East)  Heathmere (1936–1969 Heathmere Siding)  Henty (Wurt Wurt Koort)  Heywood (Fitzroy Crossing, Edgar's)  Homerton (1903–1919)  Hotspur (1860–1971)  Killara (1914–1918 Mocamboro)  Lake Condah (Condah Mission, Condah South -see Condah)  Lake Mundi (1877–1976 Tullich)  Lindsay (1849–1871 Munro's Inn, Border Post)  Lyons (1889–1971 Glenaulin, Lower Crawford)  Merino (Talisker)  Milltown (1891–1974)  Mount Eckersley Mount Richmond (1892–1976 Kentbruck, Mount Richmond South, Tarragal)  Mumbannar (1887–1971 Marp, Rennicks, Wanwin)  Myamyn (1875–1971)  Nangeela (1911–1957 Nelangie)  Narrawong  Nelson (Discovery Bay, Mouzie, Wade Junction)  Paschendale (1921–1948)  Portland (Portland South, Portland Junction)  Portland North (1904–1974 see Portland)  Portland West (1902–1970 Cape Nelson, Trewalla see Portland)  Sandford (Moredun)   Strathdownie (1877–1977 Ardno, Kaladbro, Lockinon, Malanganee, Myaring Bridge, Puralka, Strathdownie East, Strathdownie West, Wilkin)  Tahara (C1871–1965) (Tahara North)  Tahara Bridge (1902–1960)  Tahara West (1914–1968)  Tyrendarra (Mount Clay, Narrawong East)  Wallacedale (1899–1975) (Wallacedale North)  Wando Bridge (1922–1965)  Wando Vale (1901–1957 Wando Dale)  Warrock (Roseneath)  Winnap (1915–1971 Camp Corner, Drik Drik North)

Shire of Moyne

Ayrford (1945–1967)  Ballangeich (1868–1957 Ballangeich North)  Bessiebelle (1884–1972)  Broadwater (1878–1993 Deep Creek, Dunmore)  Caramut (Muston's Creek)  Chatsworth (1867–1977)  Codrington (1878–1976)  Crossley (1868–1971)  Cudgee (1875–1976)  Darlington (1848–1994 Elephant Bridge, Terrinalllum)  Dundonnell (1891–1969 Mount Fyans, Mount Violet)  Ellerslie (1869–1991)  Framlingham  Framlingham East (1925–1945)  Garvoc (1869– Yallook Bridge)  Gerrigerrup  Grassmere (1884–1993 Cooramook, Grassmere Junction)  Hawkesdale (Clonleigh, Hawkesdale West)  Hexham (1857–1994  Boortkoi)   Killarney (1862–1993)  Kirkstall (1865–1968)  Knebsworth (1902–1945)  Kolora (1871–1965 Wooriwyrite)  Koroit  Laang (1879–1966 Arundel)  Macarthur (Ardonachie, Donovans Lane, Moyne Falls, Ripponhurst, Weerangourt)  Mailor Flat (1881–1994 Mailor's Flat, Mailer Flat)  Mepunga (1902–1928)  Mepunga East (1889–1968)  Mepunga West (1925–1976)  Minhamite (1918–1974)  Minjah  Mortlake (Barnie Bolac, Murchs Corner)  Nareeb (Nareeb Nareeb)   Naringal   Naringal East   Nirranda (1871–1969 Delaney Corner)  Nirranda East (1902–1920)  Nirranda South (1938–1969)  Nullawarre (1879–1994)   Nullawarre North   Orford (1865–1977)  Panmure  Peterborough  Port Fairy (Belfast, Aringa, Bootahpool)  Pura Pura (1916–1966)  Purdeet (1918–1944)  Purnim  Purnim West Rosebrook (1865–1977)  Southern Cross (1880–1969)   St Helens (1902–1967)  Taroon  Tarrone (1953–1957)   The Cove (1928–1960)  The Sisters (1899–1977 Sisters Creek)   Toolong (1926–1972 Moyne, Moyne Siding, Moyneview)   Tower Hill (1924–1968)   Tyrendarra East (1902–1975)   Wangoom (1877–1994)  Warrabkook (1902–1930 Spring Creek)    Warrong (1892–1958)   Willatook (1921–1968)   Winslow (1865–1988)   Woolsthorpe  Woorndoo (Woorndoo Upper)  Yambuk  Yarpturk (1898–1968)

City of Warrnambool

Allansford (Allans Forest, Allansford Butter Factory, Lake Gillear)  Bushfield (Merri View)  Dennington (1863– )  Illowa (1875–1996)  Warrnambool (Warrnambool South, Warrnambool East, Warrnambool North, Warrnambool West, Warrnambool West Reserve, Hopkins Point, Hopkins River, Hopkins View, Merri Vale, Russell's Creek, Spring Gardens)  Woodford (Malones)  Yangery (1865–1968)

Shire of Southern Grampians

Balmoral  Bochara (1927–1957 Nigretta)  Branxholme (Ardachy, Morven)  Brit Brit (1923–1971)  Buckley Swamp  Bulart (1912–1946 Kyup, The Anchorage, Mooralla Estate, Parkwood)  Byaduk (Neukirch)  Byaduk North (1882–1969 see Byaduk)  Carapook (1868–1968 Carrapook, Amblerton, Clifford)  Cavendish (Mona Park)  Cherrypool (1915–1963)  Clover Flat (1923–1975 Muntham)  Coleraine  Coojar (1924–1953)  Croxton East (1868–1959)  Culla (1902–1952 Moree, Mooree)  Dunkeld (Mount Sturgeon)  Englefield (1924–1959)  Gatum (1883–1971 Gatum Gatum, Parkside)  Gazette (1954–1957)  Glenisla (1902–1969 Glenisla Crossing, Hynes)  Glenthompson (Strathmore, Yuppeekiar)  Grampians (Big Cord, Strachans)  Gringegalgona (1921–1975 The Gums)  Gritjurk (1902–1954 Gritjurk North, Gritjurk South)  Hamilton (Grangeburn, The Grange, Hamilton North, Pedrina Park)   Hensley Park (1928–1962 Kanawalla)  Hilgay (1924–1956)  Karabeal (1872–1949)  Konongwootong (1916–1957 Konongwootong North)  Melville Forest (1923–1975)  Mirranatwa (1882–1952)  Mooralla (1891–1966 Lambruck)  Morgiana (1953–1966)  Mount Napier  Moutajup (1872–1975)  Muntham (1915–1923 see Clover Flat)  Nareen (1870–1974 Wando Dale, Wando Heights)  Penshurst (Penshurst South, Mount Rouse, Purdeet East)  Pigeon Ponds (1911–1958)  Rocklands (1902–1966 Woohlpooer, Rocklands Dam, Fergusons, Glendinning)  Strathkellar (1909–1993)  Tabor (Croxton East Railway Station)  Tarrayoukyan (1878–1959)  Tarrenlea (1922–1936 Winninburn)  Tarrington (Hochkirch)  Vasey (1923–1971) (Cadden Flat)  Victoria Point  Victoria Valley (1873–1968)  Wannon (1861–1982)  Warrayure  Woodhouse  Wootong Vale (1923–1964)  Yatchaw (1915–1964)  Yulecart (1908–1957)

Rural City of Ararat

Ararat (Canton Lead, Cathcart, Warra Yadin, Ararat East)  Armstrong (Armstrong's)  Ballyrogan (1875–1930 Challicum)  Bayindeen (1892–1975)  Bornes Hill  Buangor (1863–1994 Buangor East)  Cathcart (1859–1946 and see Ararat)  Denicull Creek (1874–1931)  Dobie (1862–1972 Dobies Bridge, Dobies, Jacksons Creek)   Dunneworthy  Elmhurst (1865–1993)  Eversley (1858–1920)  Glenlogie  Lake Bolac (Mellier)  Langi Logan (1877–1970 Ardara, Jackson's Creek, Wirri Wirri, Westgarth, Langi Logan South)  Mafeking (1900–1958 Jimmy Creek)  Maroona (1872–2000 Maroona West)  Middle Creek (1881–1971)  Mininera (1913– Mininera East)  Mount Cole (1865–1975 Ben Nevis)  Mount Cole Creek (1907–1962)  Moyston (Barton, Campbell's Reef, Jallukar, Londonderry)  Narrapumelap South  Nerrin Nerrin (1913–1994)  Norval (1870–1946 Opossum Gully)  Pomonal (Pomona, Mona, Mount William)  Rhymney (1875–1957 Rhymney Reef)  Rocky Point (1920–1952)  Rossbridge (1873–1962 Ross Bridge)  Stavely (1909–1969)  Streatham (Fiery Creek)  Tatyoon (1867–1994 Tatyoon North, Tatyoon Railway, Kiora)  Warrak (1879–1975)  Westmere, Victoria (1913–1993)  Wickliffe ( Berrambool, Narrapumelap)  Willaura (Brennan, Talkadorno, Watgania, Buninjon, Lake Buninjon, Calvert, Yarram Park)  Willaura North (1872–1883 Kalymna, Kia Ora)

Shire of Northern Grampians

Avon Plains (1862–1976)  Banyena (1875–1976 Banyena South)  Barkly (1861–1981 Navarre Rush)  Beazleys Bridge (1881–1973)  Bellellen (1902–1925)  Bellfield (Bellfield Settlement)  Black Range  Bolangum (1928)  Bulgana  Callawadda (1873–1979 Callawadda South, Bismarck, Bismark, Nyallo)  Campbells Bridge (1885–1975)  Carapooee (1858–1970)  Carapooee West (1902–1969)  Concongella (1867–1868 Concongella Creek)  Coonooer West (1881–1952 Conover West, Lowe's)  Cope Cope (1873–1975)  Dalyenong  Darkbonee (1902–1950)  Deep Lead (1859–1973 Welshmans Flat)  Elberton (1902–1919 Campbell's Creek State School)  Emu (1920–1977)  Fyans Creek (1884–1965)  Germania  Glenorchy (1849– Four Posts Inn, Wimmera)  Gooroc (1876–1960)  Gowar East (1859–1973)  Grays Bridge  Gre Gre (1872–1969 Gre Gre Central, Gre Gre Village, John Bull Creek)  Gre Gre North (1891–1959)  Gre Gre South (1925–1969)  Great Western (Salt Creek, Garden Gully)  Greens Creek (1868–1965)  Halls Gap (Borough Huts, Grampians Junction)  Illawarra (1910–1965)  Joel Joel  Joel South (1916–1965)  Kanya (1891–1975)  Kooreh (1878–1969 Kooreh South, Kooroc)  Lake Fyans  Lake Lonsdale (1902–1929)  Landsborough West (1916–1968 Woodlands North)  Ledcourt (1869–1880 Heatherlie)  Marnoo  Marnoo East (1924–1930 Pilgrim's)  Marnoo West  Mitchells Hill (1879–1943)  Mokepilly  Moolerr (1902–1929 Mooleer, Darcys Bridge)  Morrl Morrl (1902–1974)  Mount Dryden (1888–1894 Grampian Quarries)  Moyreisk (1886–1970 Moyreisk North, Cherry Tree Creek, Cherry Tree)  Natte Yallock (1867–1993)  Navarre  Paradise (1891–1966)  Riachella  Rich Avon East  Rich Avon West (1905–1927)  Roses Gap  Rostron (1890–1973 Winjallock, Winjallok North)  Shays Flat (1867–1993)  Slaty Creek (1881–1944)  St Arnaud (Medlyn, St Arnaud East, View Point, Western Creek)  St Arnaud North (1885–1971)  Stawell (Bridge Inn, Pleasant Creek, -Quartz Reef, Pleasant Creek-, -Quartz Reef, Stawell-, Stawell West)  Stuart Mill (Stuartmill)  Sutherland (1883–1963 Sutherland's Plains)  Swanwater (1883–1963)  Swanwater West (1881–1951)  Tottington (1891–1916 Coorah)   Traynors Lagoon (1877–1972 Mitchell's Hill)  Tulkara  Wal Wal (1887–1981 Paynes Pool, Warranook)  Wallaloo (1888–1926)  Wallaloo East (1902–1978)  Wattle Creek (1906–1954)  Winjallok (1902–1973 Darling Flat, Flagstaff Hut)  York Plains  Zumsteins (1922–1922 Flat Rock, Flat Rock Crossing, Burrong North, Cranage)

Rural City of Horsham

Arapiles  Blackheath (1886–1961 Youngvale)  Brimpaen (1886–1957)  Bungalally (1888–1927 Burnt Creek, Green Lake, Green Lakes)  Clear Lake (1878–1977 Carchap, Jalumba, Merriville)  Dadswells Bridge  Dooen (Greenland Dam)  Drung (1872–1960 Drung Drung, Lewyn, Drung Drung South)  Duchembegarra (1912–1932 Duchembegara North, Wyn Wyn)  Grass Flat (1911–1927)  Haven  Horsham (Horsham West)  Jilpanger  Jung (1879–1994 Jung Jung, Jung Jung North, Jung North, Jerro)  Kalkee (1877–1960 Garup)  Kanagulk (1882–1956 Jeffries, Telangatuk)  Laharum (Lah-Arum)  Longerenong (1865–1958 Boningup)  Lower Norton (1902–1974 Lower Norton Creek)  McKenzie Creek (1890–1976)  Mitre (1887–1981 Mitre Lake, Mitre Lake South)  Mockinya (1911–1963)  Mount Talbot  Murra Warra (1877–1963 Kewell West)  Natimuk (Natimuk Creek, Natimuk Lake)  Noradjuha (Lowan)  Nurrabiel (1881–1974 Connangorach)  Pimpinio (Dahlen, Pimpinio West, Polkemmet)  Quantong (1894–1973)  Riverside (1891–1953 Morrison)  St Helens Plains (1908–1957 Helens Plains, Saint Helens, Golton Golton, Golton South)  Telangatuk East (1882–1975)  Tooan (1876–1972 Tooan East)  Toolondo (1908–1977 Brooksby's)  Vectis (1883–1976 Remlaw, Vectis East, Vectis South)  Wail (1882–1975 Wail North, Wail West)  Wartook (1888–1966)  Wonwondah (1881–1952 Wonwondah East, Wonwondah North, Wonwondah South, Heathvale)

Shire of West Wimmera

Apsley (Lake Wallace)  Benayeo (1882–1924 Tallageira)  Bringalbert (1888–1955 Bringalbert North, Bringalbert South)  Charam (1898–1976)  Chetwynd (1873–1996 Chetwynd East, Caupaul, Tallangower)  Connewirrecoo (1890–1965)  Dergholm (C1876- Red Cap Creek)  Dorodong (Kanawinka, Wombat Ridge)  Douglas (1886–1976 Kia Ora, St Evins)  Edenhope (Scrubby Lake)  Goroke (Bellmore, Spring Bank)  Gymbowen  Harrow (Upper Glenelg, Kalang, Kout Narin, Salt Creek)   Kadnook (1937–1940 Burke Bridge)   Kaniva (Budjik, Yarrock, Sandsmere, Yanipy)   Karnak (1886–1960 Lake Karnak, Kangawall)  Langkoop (1902–1991 Carantah, Meereek)  Lawloit (see Nhill)  Lillimur (1868–1985 Cove, Dinyarrak, Lillimur North, Lillimur South, Lockhart, Yearinga)  Miga Lake (1902–1968)  Minimay  Miram (1887–1993 Miram Piram, Miram South)  Neuarpurr (1883–1979 Neuarpur)  Nurcoung (1902–1958 Cooack, Duffholme)  Ozenkadnook (1902–1970 Dopewarra)  Patyah (1902–1957)  Peronne (1902–1978 Mortat, Booroopki, Carpolac, Morea)  Poolaijelo (1902–1978 Poolaigelo)  Powers Creek (1889–1980 Bogolara)  Serviceton (Leeor, Serviceton North, Serviceton South)  Telopea Downs (1962–1973)  Ullswater (1904–1947 Awonga)  Wombelano (1887–1976 Mullagh)

Shire of Hindmarsh

Albacutya (1911–1932 Lake Albacutya)  Antwerp (Antwerp North)  Broughton (1888–1937 Deakin)  Dimboola (Nine Creeks, Arkona, Katyil, Katyil West, Dart Dart, Kornheim, Edolsfield)  Gerang Gerung (1887–1988)  Glenlee (1890–1916 Ni Ni, Ni Ni East, Woorak)  Jeparit (Allanby, Dalmallee, Detpa, Ellam, Hounsells, Westerns, Peppers Plain, Pullut, Tullyvea) Kenmare (1896–1979)  Kiata (1880–1975 Kiata East, Kiata North, Kiata South, Kiata West)  Lake Hindmarsh (see Jeparit)  Little Desert  Lorquon (1883–1971)  Netherby (Baker, Lorquon West, Perenna)   Nhill (Balrootan, Balrootan North, Boyeo, Diapur, Diapur Town,  Kanimakatka, Kinimakatka, Mount Elgin, Ni Ni Well, Propodollah, Salisbury, Tarranginnie, Haycroft, Tarranginnie East, Bleak House, Winiam, Winiam East, Woorak West)  Rainbow (Rainbow Rise, Pella, Pijick, Werrap, Wheatlands)  Tarranyurk (1891–2001 Polacks Corner, see Antwerp)  Yanac (1884–2000 Yanac A Yanac, Yanac North, Yanac South)

Shire of Yarriambiack

Areegra  Aubrey (1887–1933 Cannum North)  Bangerang (1888–1947 Bangerang North, Banjerang, Homecroft, Nyam, Nyamville)  Beulah (Beulah East, Beulah West, Brentwood, Norwegian, Galaquil, Galaquil East, Kerewichip, Kurdweechee)  Boolite (1890–1951)  Brim (1890– Brim East)  Cannum (1881–1930 Cannum East, Cannum South)  Crymelon (1902–1963 Angip, Yellangip North)  Hopetoun (Albacutya, Burroin, Dattuck, Hopetoun West, Hopevale, Goyura)  Kellalac (1877–1955 Ailsa)  Kewell (1874–1963 Kewell East, Kewell North, Byrneville, Byrneville State School)  Laen (1877–1943)  Lah (1891–1971 Yellanghip, Yellangip, Yellangip East)  Lascelles (Minapre, Gama)  Lubeck (1879–1989)  Minyip (Brooklet, Kircheim, Nullan, Dunmunkle East)  Murtoa (Coromby, Ashens, Jung Jung South, Shanty Corner)  Patchewollock (Baring, Dering, Patchewollock North)   Rosebery (1884–1974 Rosebery East, Rosebery West)  Rupanyup (Karkarooc, Burrum, Lallat, Lallat Plains, Burrereo, Raluana, Rupanyup North, Wirchilleba, Rupanyup South)  Sheep Hills (1875–1981 Kinloch, Tarkedia, Kingumwill)  Speed   Turriff (1907–1977 Turriff West)  Wallup (1892–1977 Wallup East)  Warracknabeal (Werracknebeal, Batchica, Mellis, Challambra, Challamba, Challamba Dam)  Wilkur (1904–1957 Beyal, Cameron's, Wilkur South)  Willenabrina  Woomelang (Mount Pleasant, Mount Richards)  Wyperfield National Park  Yaapeet (1912– Turkey Bottom, Nypo)

Shire of Buloke

Ballapur  Banyan   Barrakee (1883–1973 Barrakee North, Hallam)  Berriwillock   Bimbourie (Bimbourne, Daytrap Corner)  Birchip (Wirrimbirchip)  Birchip West  Boigbeat  Buckrabanyule (Hallam)  Bunguluke (1875–1942 Bungeluke, Bungeluke North, Bungeluke West, Bungeluke, Fairview, Tyrrell Creek)  Carron (1881–1949)  Charlton (Charlton East, Yowen Hill)  Chirrip (1890–1964 Chirrup)  Cokum  Coonooer Bridge (Conover)  Corack (1877–1954)  Corack East (1891–1976)  Culgoa (Kaneira)  Curyo (1900–1976)  Donald (Mount Jeffcott, Dairy Farm, Lake Buloke, Buloke)  Dooboobetic (Doboobetic)  Dumosa (Black Gate)  Gil Gil  Glenloth  Glenloth East  Granite Flat  Jeffcott  Jeffcott North (1880–1930 Banyenong, Mount Jeffcott North)  Jeruk (1880–1930)  Jil Jil (1888–1943 Marlbed, Reseigh)  Kalpienung  Karyrie (1892–1919)  Kinnabulla (1902–1973)  Laen East  Laen North (1881–1919)  Lake Tyrrell  Lawler (1910–1930 Kendle)   Litchfield (1877–1979 Witchipool)  Marlbed (1888–1911 see Jil Jil)  Massey (1885–1954)  Morton Plains (1864–1931)  Myall (1891–1965)  Nandaly Nareewillock (1881–1942 Narrewillock)  Narraport (1879–1968)  Ninda Nullawil Nyarrin  Pier Milan (1911–1971 Pier-Millan, Pier Millan)  Reedy Dam (1902–1929)  Rich Avon  Sea Lake Springfield (1902–1940 Springfield Station, Rolighed)  Straten (1923–1952 Stratton, Speed East)  Sutton  Teddywaddy (1881–1973)  Teddywaddy West   Thalia (1892–1969)  Tittybong  Towaninny (Towaninnie)  Towaninny South  Turriff East (1918–1940)  Tyrrell (1902–1940 Tyrrell West, Long Plains)  Tyrrell Downs (1898–1927)  Warmur (1905–1930 Warmur West)  Warne  Watchem Watchem West  Watchupga (1900–1972 Watcheupga)  Whirily (1912–1913)  Willangie (1905–1931 Lenrich)  Wooroonook (1877–1958 Wooroonooke)  Woosang (1879–1940)  Wycheproof (Moffat, Mount Wycheproof)  Wycheproof South  Yawong Hills (1875–1942 Yawong)   Yeungroon (1893–1933)   Yeungroon East (1902–1933)

Rural City of Mildura

Big Desert (S1914–1962 Kurnbrunin, Wrathall, Yarto, Waggon Flat)   Birdwoodton  Boinka  Cabarita (Lake Hawthorn)  Cardross  Carina (Mulcra)  Carwarp (Boonoonar, Ginquam, Ginquam South, Nowingi, Yatpool, Yatpool West)  Colignan  Cowangie (Bunurouk, Bunurouk West, Cowangie North, Daalko, Koonoa, Kow Plains, Pallarang)  Cullulleraine (Kulnine East)  Hattah  Iraak  Irymple (Billabong, Irymple South)  Koorlong (Benetook, Thurla)  Kulwin (Lietpar)  Lindsay Point  Linga (Manpy)  Merbein  Merbein South  Merbein West  Meringur (Karween, Meringur North, Morkalla, Morkalla North, Tunart)  Merrinee (Merrinee North, Pirlta, Tarrango, Willah)  Mildura (Mildura East, Mildura South, Mildura West)  Mittyack (Rownack)  Murray-Sunset  (Raak Plain)  Murrayville (Duddo, Duddo Wells, Danyo, Goongee, Gunamalary)  Nangiloc  Neds Corner (Kulnine, Lock 9)  Nichols Point  Ouyen (Galah, Galah North, Nulkwyne, Tiega, Timberoo, Timberoo South, Wymlet, Trinita, Kiamal, Cramerton, Boulka, Bronzewing, Nunga, Gypsum, Gypsum Siding, Boorongie, Boorongie North, Wagant)  Panitya (Berrook, Boltons, Boltons Bore, Manya, Manya North, Ngallo, Panitya East, Sunset)  Red Cliffs (Karadoc, Stewart)  Tempy (Tempy East)  Torrita (Gunner, Kattyong, Nyang)  Tutye (Tyalla)  Underbool (Gnarr)  Walpeup (Paigne)  Wargan (Boy Creek, Upper Kulnine)  Werrimull (Bambill, Bambill South, Cowan's Tank, Karawinna, Karawinna North, Koleya, Kurnwill, Yarrara, Yarrara North)  Yelta (Cowanna Bend, Redgrove)

Rural City of Swan Hill

Annuello (Koimbo, Margooya)  Bannerton (Banner)  Beverford  Bolton  Boundary Bend (Tinaro Creek)  Bulga (1905–1953) Castle Donnington  Chillingollah (Chillingollah East)  Chinangin  Chinkapook (Christmas Tank)  Cocamba  Fish Point  Gerahmin (Daytrap, Day Trap, Day Trap North)  Goschen (Lalbert Road)  Gowanford (Ganeit)  Happy Valley  Kenley (1923–1967 Piambie)  Kooloonong (Koorkab)  Kunat (Kooem)  Lake Boga  Lake Powell (1918–1952 Belsar Island, Kyndalyn, Narrung West, Youngeira, Yungera)  Liparoo  Manangatang (Larundel, Leepi, Prooinga)  Meatian  Miralie (1925–1925)  Murnungin  Murrawee (1921–1947)  Murraydale (1916–1969)  Narrung (1902–1969)  Natya (Haysdale, Spinifex)  Nowie (Nowie North, Nowie South)  Nyah  Nyah West  Nyrraby (1902–1931 Rynaby, Yarraby Tank, Yarraby)  Pental Island  Piangil (Piangil North, Tudor, Kalma, Coonimur, Piangil West)  Pira  Polisbet  Robinvale (Bumbong, Robinvale South)  Speewa  Swan Hill (Swan Hill North, Swan Hill Folk Museum, Swan Hill Pioneer Settlement)  Swan Hill West  Tol Tol (Latten's Bend)  Towan (1915–1962)  Tresco  Tresco West (S1923–1925 see Tresco)  Turoar (1919–1942)  Tyntynder (Tyntynder Central see Nyah)  Tyntynder South (1902–1969)  Ultima (Fourteen Mile Plain, Mumbel Plains)  Ultima East  Vinifera (Tyntynder West)  Waitchie  Wandown  Wemen  Winlaton (S1927–1944)  Winnambool (1928–1942 Tyseley, Piccadilly Corner)  Wood Wood (1900–1987)  Woorinen (R1915–1993)  Woorinen North (S1921–1976 Dorrington)  Woorinen South (McNaughton's)

Shire of Gannawarra

Appin (1885–1956 Violet Bank)  Appin Park (1960– )  Bael Bael (1902–1919)  Beauchamp (1902–1944 Korrak Korrak)  Benjeroop (1883–1967)  Budgerum East (1921–1922)  Burkes Bridge  Cannie (1905–1976)  Capels Crossing (1879–1946)  Cohuna (Mologa, Cohuna Township)  Cullen (1884–1941, see Cohuna)  Daltons Bridge  Dingwall (1890–1969 Langville, Murphy's Lake, Sunnydale)  Fairley (1890–1960 Reedy Lake)  Gannawarra (1878–1955 Gannawarrah, Gannawarra North)  Gonn Crossing (1912–1969)  Gredgwin (1912–1977)  Horfield (1923–1948)  Kangaroo Lake  Keely (1919–1949 Keely Rail)  Kerang (Pyramid Creek, Yeoburn, Yeoburn East)  Kerang East (1887–1957)  Koondrook (Culfearne)  Koroop (1879–1971 Pooles)  Lake Charm (1878– Lake Charm Railway)  Lake Meran (1884–1947 Lake Meering, Meering, Meran Downs)  Lalbert (1894– )  Leitchville (Hawkins, Mincha East, Winter Grove, Red Rise)  Macorna (R1885–1993 Glenrose, Hawkinston, Daviesholm)  Macorna North (1884–1941 Macorna South, Rowan, Rowland, Rowlands)  McMillans (1898–1959)  Mead (1910–1954 Meade)  Meering West (1908–1964)  Milnes Bridge (1902–1941)  Mincha West (1879–1931)  Murrabit  Murrabit West (1924–1969 see Murrabit)  Myall (1891–1965)  Mystic Park (1890–1978)  Ninyeunook (1878–1968)  Normanville (1900–1916)  Oakvale (1891–1954)  Pine View  Quambatook (Budgerum)  Reedy Lake (1890–1910 Reedy Lake Railway Station, see Fairley)  Sandhill Lake (1881–1953)  Teal Point (1902–1966)  Tragowel (Kerang South)  Wandella (1924–1939 Rangie)  Wee Wee Rup (1877–1953 Echunga)  Westby

Shire of Campaspe

Ballendella (1906–1976)  Bamawm (1880–1974 Bamawm Central)  Bamawm Extension (1913–1969)  Bonn  Burnewang  Burramboot  Carag Carag (1891–1961)  Colbinabbin (Colbinabbin West)  Cornella (1885–1951 Cornella East)  Corop (Bonn South, Corop West, Lake Cooper)  Diggora (1876–1969 Diggora South, Diggora West, McColl, Pannoomilloo, Warragamba Creamery, Warragamba)  Echuca (Hopwoods Ferry, Hopwoods Punt, Echuca East, Echuca South, Park Gates, Kanyapella South, Simmie)  Echuca Village (1902–1951 Echuca Village Settlement)  Echuca West  Fairy Dell (1916–1971)  Girgarre (Stanhope North)  Gobarup (1902–1919 Gobarup East)  Gunbower (Kow Swamp)  Kanyapella (1882–1953, see Tongala)  Kotta (1923–1985)  Koyuga (1887–1993 Koyuga South, Blain's)  Ky Valley (1913–1955 Kyvalley)  Kyabram (Sheridan, Taripta, Kyabram East, Mount Scobie)  Lancaster (Kyabram East)  Lockington (Hunterston, Pannoobamawm)  Milloo (1878–1965)  Moora (1902–1969 Mathieson's, Moora East)  Muskerry (1901–1956 Muskerry and Weston State School, Muskerry East, Muskerry West)  Myola (1902–1950 Campaspe, Campaspe East, Myola East)  Nanneella (1878– Nanneella North, Nanneella South, Top Creek)  Patho (1892–1991 Patho South, Patho West, Picaninny Creek)  Pine Grove (1876–1962 Pine Grove East, Wanurp)  Redcastle (1860–1944)  Rochester  Roslynmead (1902–1951)  Runnymede (1867–1945 Campaspe, Creek View, Runnymeade)  Rushworth (Karook)  Stanhope (Lauderdale)  Strathallan (1913–1967)  Tennyson (1882– Pannoomilloo West, Piavella)  Terrick Terrick East (1877–1941)  Timmering (1875–1930 Timmering East, Parkes Plains)  Tongala (Tongala East, Barep)  Toolleen (1872– )  Torrumbarry (Welton)  Wanalta (1879–1980)  Waranga Shores (1890–1935 Waranga, Waranga Basin, Waranga Outlet, Waranga Quarry)  Wharparilla (1873–1963 Wharparilla North, McEvoy's)  Wyuna (1906–1967 Hildebrand, McCoy's Bridge, Pederick, Pedericks)  Wyuna East (1909–1930)  Yambuna (1894–1976 Bundri)

Shire of Loddon

Appin South (1913–1970)  Arnold (Arnold's Bridge)  Arnold West (1913–1965)  Auchmore  Barraport (1902–1972 Barrapoort)  Barraport West (1877–1950 Barrapoort, Barrapoort West)  Bealiba (1858– Cochrane's, Lower Emu)  Bears Lagoon (1878–1975 Janiember East, Murnica)  Berrimal (1887–1943 Berrimal West)  Boort (Boort West, Boort East, Verdant Vale)  Borung (1881–1993)  Brenanah (Buggins Flat, Forbes Creek Valley, Hope Creek Valley)  Bridgewater (see Bridgewater on Loddon)  Bridgewater North  Bridgewater on Loddon  Burkes Flat (1868–1967)  Calivil (1879–1982)  Campbells Forest (1876–1974 Four Winds)  Canary Island (1878–1930 Canary Island South)  Catumnal (1878–1930 Woodlands)  Cochranes Creek (1902–1941)  Derby (1877–1970)  Dingee (East Loddon)  Durham Ox (1853–1993 Hardy's Inn)  Eastville (1877–1974)  Eddington  Fentons Creek  Fernihurst (1887–1992)  Fiery Flat (1902–1952)  Gladfield (1887–1930)  Glenalbyn (1886–1973)  Inglewood (New Inglewood, Old Inglewood, Bul-a-Bul, Bullabul)  Jarklin (1874–1994)  Jungaburra   Kamarooka (1875–1980 Kamarooka East)   Kamarooka North (1885–1976)   Kingower (1854–1969 Mount Moliagul, Kooyoora)   Kinypanial (1877–1952 Kinneypaniel, Kinneypaniel South, Kinypanial South)   Korong Vale (Korongvale)   Kurraca   Kurraca West (1887–1959)   Kurting (1883–1975)   Laanecoorie (1869–1993)   Lake Marmal (1878–1959)   Leaghur (1881–1952 Sunny Vue)   Llanelly (1865–1994 Maidentown, Irish Town)   Loddon Vale (1879–1957)   Logan (Avoca Forest)   McIntyre (1857–1942 McIntyre's, Orville, Opossum Hill)   Mincha (1886–1977 Hawkins, Mincha East, Winter Grove)   Minmindie (1887–1967 Strathmore)  Mitiamo (Hayanmi, Terrick South, Terrick Terrick South)  Mologa (1881–1969 Mologa East, Central Mologa)   Murphys Creek (1902–1969)   Mysia (Calverton, Durham Downs)   Newbridge (Poseidon)  Nine Mile (1902–1956)  Painswick (1889–1995)  Pompapiel (1911–1954)  Powlett Plains (1871–1958 Loddon Rise)  Prairie (R1884–1982 Pannoomilloo Railway Station)  Pyramid Hill (Bald Rock)  Rheola (1869–1974 Berlin, Lingham's Flat)  Richmond Plains (1885–1959)  Salisbury West (1878–1971 North Salisbury, Salisbury Plains)  Serpentine (Serpentine Creek, Yarrayne)  Skinners Flat  Sylvaterre (1883–1931)  Tandarra (1877–1973 Yallook, Yallook Railway Station, Tandara Railway Crossing, Tandara)  Tarnagulla (Sandy Creek, Nuggety Gully)  Terrappee (1887–1927 Terrapee)  Terrick Terrick (1873–1931)  Terrick Terrick East (1877–1941)  Waanyarra (1856–1969 Jones' Creek, Waanyarra Rush)  Wedderburn (Kerang, Yorkshire Flat)  Wedderburn Junction (1884–1977 Wedderburn Road)  Wehla (1860–1966 Jericho)  Woodstock On Loddon (1864–1962)  Woodstock West (1877–1959)  Woolshed Flat (1857–1953 Woolshed)  Wychitella (1875–1990 Wychitella South)  Wychitella North (1902–1930)  Yando (1902–1930)  Yarraberb (1919–1954)  Yarrawalla (1877–1959 Yarrawalla South)

City of Greater Bendigo

Suburbs of Bendigo
Ascot  Bendigo ( Castleton, Bendigo Creek, Sandhurst, Lansell Plaza, Tysons Reef)  Bendigo East (1915–1965)  Bendigo North (1947– )  Bendigo West (1951–1973 Sparrowhawk)  California Gully (1864– )  Diamond Hill (1872–1947)  Eaglehawk  Eaglehawk North  Epsom (1857– )  Flora Hill   Golden Gully (1874–1930)  Golden Square  Ironbark  Jackass Flat  Kangaroo Flat (Kangaroo Flat South)  Kennington  Knowsley (1889–1983)  Long Gully (1857– Comet Hill)  Quarry Hill (1912– ) 
Sailors Gully (1866–1875)  Sandhurst East (1952– )  Spring Gully (1861– )  Strathdale (1994– )   Summerfield (1883–1965 Neilborough North)  Tysons Reef (1953–1994)  White Hills (1857–1994)

Towns and localities
Argyle (1915–1918)  Avonmore (1887–1974 South Elmore, Elmore South, May Reef, Mayreef)  Axe Creek (1930–1958 see Longlea)  Axedale  Bagshot (1883–1967)   Bagshot North (1910–1977 Lyndale)   Barnadown (1875–1971 Clare Inn, Barnedown)   Big Hill (1860–1922 Crusoe, Crusoe Hill)  Costerfield (1863–1993 Costerfield South, Wild Duck Creek)   Derrinal (1889–1964 Sheedy Heights)  Drummartin (1885–1951)  Elmore (Bertram's Inn, Campaspie, Runnymede, Minto)  Emu Creek (1864–1960 Strathfieldsaye)  Eppalock (1910–1974 Eppalock Weir, Mosquito Creek)  Fosterville (1867–1974)  Goornong (1884– Goornong South)   Heathcote (McIvor Creek, Pink Cliffs)  Hunter (1921–1980 Hunter South)  Huntly (1860– Huntley)  Huntly North (1913–1966 Neilborough East)  Junortoun (1912– Junorton)  Kimbolton (1889–1993)  Ladys Pass (1902–1959 Junction Hotel)  Leichardt (1878–1993)  Lockwood (1855–1981 Lockwood North)  Lockwood South (1907– )  Longlea (1889–1989 Axe Creek)  Lyal (1872–1955 Redesdale North, Lyall)  Maiden Gully (1908– Maiden's Gully, Specimen Hill)  Mandurang (1874– )  Mandurang South (1906–1986)   Marong (Bullock Creek)  Mia Mia (Meadow Valley, Spring Plains (in Mitchell Shire)) Mount Camel (1959–1970)  Myers Flat (1858–1971 Myer's Creek)  Myrtle Creek (1928–1960 Pilchers Bridge)  Neilborough (1858–1975 Whipstick, Neilborough North, Summerfield)  Raywood  Sebastian (1874–1976)  Sedgwick (1880–1994)  Shelbourne (1871–1976 East Shelbourne, Shelbourne East)  Strathfieldsaye (Strathfieldsaye North)   Wellsford (Yankee Creek)  Whipstick (Gum Tree Flat, see Neilborough)  Wilsons Hill (Wilson Reef)  Woodvale (1875–1950 Sydney Flat)

Shire of Mount Alexander

Barfold (Emberton)  Baringhup (1858–1974 Baringhup East, Cairn Curran Reservoir)  Baringhup West (1884–1954)  Barkers Creek (1858–1977)  Bradford (1902–1919 Pollard)  Campbells Creek (Little Bendigo, Nerrina, Strathloddon)  Campbelltown (1861–1993 Glengower)  Castlemaine (Forrest Creek, Mount Alexander, Happy Valley, Clinkers Hill, Iredale Terrace, Kalimna Park, Milkmaids Flat, Norwood Hill, Ten Foot Hill, Wesley Hill,  Winters Flat)   Chewton  Chewton Bushlands  Elphinstone  Faraday  Fryerstown (Fryer's Creek, Spring Gully)  Glenluce (1868–1969)  Golden Point   Gower (1885–1953 Gowar, Gowar East)  Green Gully (1862–1969)  Guildford  Harcourt  Harcourt North (1925–1971 Dog Rocks Saddle)  Irishtown  Joyces Creek (1860–1952)  Langley (1861–1970 Barfold)  Lockwood South (1907– )  Maldon (Porcupine Flat, Perkins Reef, Tarrangower Fields)  McKenzie Hill (Diamond Gully)  Metcalfe (Watchbox Gully)  Metcalfe East (1909–1968 East Metcalfe)  Moonlight Flat (1879–1958)  Muckleford (Muckleford North)  Muckleford South (1873–1970)  Neereman (1881–1917)  Newstead  Nuggetty (1864–1903 Nuggety Reef)  Ravenswood (1858–1885)  Ravenswood South Redesdale  Sandon (1864–1970 Eberys)  Strangways (1865–1974 Captain's Gully)  Strathlea (1923–1968)  Sutton Grange (Wellington Flat, Preston Vale)  Taradale  Tarilta (1861–1965 Kangaroo)  Tarrengower (1913–1941 Brokenback, Tarrangower)  Vaughan  Walmer (1868–1958 Muckleford Railway Station, Woodbrook, Chinaman's Creek)  Welshmans Reef (1861–1969)  Werona (1875–1968 Campbelltown East, Werona Basin)  Yandoit Hills (1860–1972 Yandoit)  Yapeen (1858–1965 Strathloddon)

Shire of Central Goldfields

Adelaide Lead (Opossum Gully, Norval)  Alma  Amherst  Archdale (1878–1961)  Archdale Junction (1902–1954)   Bet Bet (1861–1975)  Betley (1889–1975 Middle Bridge)  Bowenvale (1865–1981 Timor, Leviathan Reef)  Bromley (1861–1942 Burnt Creek)  Bung Bong (Moore's Flat)  Caralulup (1879–1954)  Carisbrook (Charlotte Plains, Mosquito Flat)  Cotswold (1910–1924)  Craigie (1860–1949 McCullum's Creek, Cockatoo, Narrigal)  Daisy Hill (1875–1968 Emu)  Dunluce (1904–1942 Natte Yallock East)  Dunolly  Flagstaff   Golden Point   Goldsborough (1868–1964 Goldsborough Reef see Dunolly)  Havelock (1861–1933)  Inkerman (1861–1919)  Lillicur   Majorca (1863–1973 Tullaroop Dam)  Maryborough (Primrose Hill)  Moliagul  Moolort (Moolort North)  Moonlight Flat (1890–1958 Moonlight)   Mount Cameron (1871–1994)  Mount Glasgow  Mount Hooghly (1886–1940)  Natte Yallock (1867–1993)   Red Lion (1864–1910 Mount Greenock)  Rodborough (1879–1929)  Simson (1888–1895 Shaw's Reef Railway Station, Simson's Railway Station see Maryborough)  Stony Creek (1902–1907)  Talbot (Back Creek, Rocky Flat)  Timor (1865–1884 see Bowenvale)  Timor West (1880–1955)  Wareek (1870–1977)

Shire of Pyrenees

Amphitheatre (Green Hill, Green Hills, Green Hill Creek, Rosyth)  Avoca (Bolerch, Riversdale, Four Mile Flat)  Ballyrogan (1875–1930)  Barkly (1861–1981 Navarre Rush)  Beaufort (Fiery Creek, Eurambeen, Raglan, Shirley)  Brewster (1924–1944)   Burnbank (1926–1966 Burn Bank see Lexton)   Carngham (1856–1973)  Carranballac (1910–1973 Bendemere)  Chepstowe (1849–1967 Mortchup)  Chute (1866–1959 Charlton)  Cross Roads   Crowlands (1856–1973)  Ercildoune (1909–1909)  Evansford (1865–1971 Stewarton)  Frenchmans (1880–1969)  Glenbrae (1909–1931)  Glenlofty (1902–1929 Glenlofty Creek)  Glenpatrick (1873–1951)  Hillcrest (1926–1969)  Homebush (1863–1944)  Lake Goldsmith (1863–1950 Stockyard Hill)   Lake Wongan  Lamplough  Landsborough (1862– Malakoff)  Langi Kal Kal (see Trawalla)  Lexton (Burn Bank, Doctors Creek)  Lower Homebush  Main Lead (1871–1934)  Mena Park (1920–1952 Lillerie)  Middle Creek (1881–1971 Middle Creek Rail)  Moonambel (1861–1986 Mountain Creek)  Mount Emu (1950–1950)  Mount Lonarch (1885–1976)  Natte Yallock (1867–1993)   Nerring (1866–1953 Sailor's Gully)  Nowhere Creek  Percydale (1862–1942 Fiddler's Creek, Pyrenees)  Pittong (1902–1954 Knight, O'Meara's)  Raglan  Rathscar (1884–1972)  Rathscar West (1902–1933)  Redbank (1861–1981)  Snake Valley (1859– Chinaman's Flat, Chinaman Flat, Preston Hill, Poverty Point)  Stockyard Hill (1863–1932)  Stoneleigh  Tanwood (1902–1959 Wattle Grove, Kimberley)  Trawalla  Warrenmang (1871–1930 Glenshee)  Waterloo (Waterloo Plains)  Wattle Creek (1906–1954)  Waubra (The Springs, Mount Mitchell)  Yalla-Y-Poora (1950–1951)

Shire of Hepburn

Allendale (Allandale)  Basalt (1890–1895 Basalt Hill)  Blampied (Eastern Hill, Kangaroo Hills)  Broomfield (1875–1974)   Bullarto  Cabbage Tree (Cabbage Tree Flat)  Campbelltown (1861–1993 Glengower)  Clunes (Lord Clyde)  Clydesdale (1861–1974)  Coomoora (1890–1965) Creswick (Creswick's Creek, Graham's Hill, Hollinwood)  Creswick North (1913–1973)  Daylesford (Victoria Park, Bryces Flat, Kidds Gully, Wombat Flat)  Dean  Denver (1902–1959 Burke)  Drummond (1862–1974)  Drummond North (1885–1956)  Dry Diggings (1863–1921 see Mount Franklin)  Dunach (1870–1931)  Eganstown (Deep Creek, Egan's Town)  Elevated Plains  Franklinford  Glengower (1868–1952 Middle Creek, Powlett's Hill, Powlett Hill)   Glenlyon  Guildford (1861–1993)  Hepburn (1890–1995 see Hepburn Springs)  Hepburn Springs (Jim Crow Diggings, Old Racecourse, Spring Creek)   Kingston  Kooroocheang (1864–1974 Hit Or Miss)  Langdons Hill (1883–1935)  Lawrence (1886–1949 Clementston)  Leonards Hill (Leonards)  Little Hampton (1890–1995)  Lyonville  Mollongghip (1890–1995)  Mount Beckworth (1863–1955 Mount Beckwith)  Mount Franklin (1863–1968 Dry Diggings)  Mount Prospect (1862–1967)  Musk (1879–1974 Musk Creek)  Musk Vale (1870–1965 Muskvale, Woodburn)  Newbury (1863–1974 Bateman's, Bateman's Hill, Jack's Hotel (Newbury))  Newlyn (Bellvue)  Newlyn North (1915–1993)  North Blackwood (Blackwood North, Waldron)  Porcupine Ridge (1902–1909)  Rocklyn (1862–1970 Rocky Lead, Wombat) Sailors Falls (1914–1972 Borland's)  Sailors Hill  Shepherds Flat (1866–1968)  Smeaton (Jerusalem, Moorookyle)  Smokey Town  Springmount (1878–1977)  Sulky (1859–1966 Sulky Gully, Waubra Junction)  Taradale (1856– )  Trentham  Trentham East (1871–1976 East Trentham)  Tylden South (1875–1895 South Tylden)  Ullina (1866–1966)  Wheatsheaf (1902–1959)  Yandoit (1860–1972 Kennedys Gully)

City of Ballarat

Addington  Alfredton  Ascot (1858–1969)  Bakery Hill (1992– )  Bald Hills (1861–1968)  Ballarat Central (Ballaarat, Ballarat West, Ballarat South)  Ballarat East  Ballarat North  Black Hill  Blowhard (1861–1966 Mount Blowhard, Blowhard Rail, The Rose)  Bo Peep (1872–1924 Bo Peep Hill, Trunk Lead)  Bonshaw  Brown Hill (Woodmans Hill)  Buninyong (1839–1859 Bunnenyong)  Bunkers Hill  Burrumbeet (1857–1978 Black Swamp (in Pyrenees Shire))  Canadian (1886–1988)  Cardigan (1861–1975 Kopke)  Cardigan Village  Chapel Flat  Coghills Creek (1860–1968)  Delacombe  Durham Lead (1861–1976 Hardies Hill)  Ercildoune (1909–1909 Ercildoun)  Eureka (1946–1993)  Glen Park (Bungaree Springs, Glenpark)  Glendaruel (1858–1955)  Glendonnell (1868–1917 Glendonald)  Golden Point (1851–1864 Poverty Point, 1864– Sovereign Hill)  Gong Gong (1877–1917)  Invermay   Invermay Park  Lake Gardens  Lake Wendouree (1956 for Olympic games rowing)  Learmonth (Lake Learmonth)  Lucas (2011– )  Magpie (1873–1972 Black Lead)  Miners Rest (1857– Midas)  Mitchell Park  Mount Bolton (see Addington) (1863–1974)  Mount Clear (1865– )  Mount Helen   Mount Pleasant (1858–1983)  Mount Rowan (1867–1974)  Nerrina (1862–1971 Little Bendigo)  Newington (1864–1974)  Redan (Redan Bridge)  Scotchmans Lead (Scotchmans, Yarrowee)  Scotsburn (Scott's Marsh)  Sebastopol  Soldiers Hill  Tourello (1868–1950)  Warrenheip (1859–1988)  Weatherboard (1868–1969 Weatherboard Hill)  Wendouree (Wendouree West, Wendouree Village)  Windermere (1862–1975)

Golden Plains Shire

Bamganie (1877–1961)  Bannockburn (Leigh Road, Wabdallah)   Barunah Park  Berringa (Kangaroo)  Cambrian Hill (1865–1966)  Cape Clear  Corindhap (Break O'Day, Break Of Day)   Dereel  Durdidwarrah (1866–1919 Stony Creek)  Enfield (1861–1971 Whim Holes, Little Hard Hills)  Garibaldi  Gheringhap  Haddon (1863–1976 Sago Hill)  Happy Valley (1860–1959)  Hesse (1871–1966 Warrambine, Warambeen, Halfway)  Illabarook (1862–1971 Bull Dog, Bulldog Flat)  Inverleigh (Doroq, Barunah Plains)  Lethbridge (Golf Hill)  Linton (Linton's)  Mannibadar (1924–1947)  Maude  Meredith (Woodburn Creek, Woodbourne)  Mount Mercer (1865–1965 Lawaluk)  Murgheboluc (1860–1995)  Napoleons (Napoleon)  Newtown (Newtown-Scarsdale)  Nintingbool  Piggoreet (1864–1952)  Pitfield (1857–1946 Pitfield Plains)  Rokewood  Rokewood Junction (1868–1976 see Rokewood)  Ross Creek (1865–1969 Ross Village, Golden Lake)  Russells Bridge (1923–1930)  Scarsdale (1860– Italian Gully)  She Oaks (Sheoaks)  Shelford (The Leigh)  Smythes Creek (1905–1993 see Smythesdale)  Smythesdale  Springdallah (1902–1930 Burke's)  Staffordshire Reef (1859–1988)  Steiglitz (Steiglitz North, Pipehead)  Stonehaven (1859–1988)  Sutherlands Creek (Sutherland Creek)  Teesdale  Wallinduc (1859–1988 Hollybush, Holly Bush)  Werneth (1859–1988 Wilgul)  Willowvale (1924–1955)

Shire of Corangamite

Berrybank (1908–1978 Berry Bank, Naringhil South, Naringal South)  Bookaar (1905–1955 Bookar Creamery, Bookar, The Gums)  Boorcan (1887–1975 Burcan)  Bostock Creek (1902–1962 Bostocks Creek Creamery, Bostocks Creek)  Bradvale (1923–1954)  Brucknell (1902–1932 Brucknell South, Nullawarre East)  Bullaharre (1924–1951 Bullaharee)  Camperdown  Carpendeit (1871–1967)  Chocolyn  Cobden  Cobrico (1886–1971 Cobrico Cheese Factory)  Cooriemungle  Cowleys Creek (1880–1949)  Curdie Vale (1920–1969 Boggy Creek)  Curdies River (1910–1968)  Derrinallum (Geelengla, Tooliorook, Mount Elephant, Cloven Hills)  Dixie (1907–1957) Duverney (1914–1961 Strathvean)  Ecklin South (1902–1969 Mumblin)  Elingamite (1902–1937)  Elingamite North  Foxhow  Gellibrand Lower (1893–1969 Lower Gellibrand, Burrupa)  Glenfyne (1937–1968)  Glenormiston North (1902–1970 Glenormiston)  Glenormiston South (1909–1994 Glenormiston Butter Factory)  Gnotuk (1910–1976)  Heytesbury Lower (1945–1969)  Jancourt (1902–1904)  Jancourt East (1938–1967)  Kariah (1881–1936)  Kennedys Creek (1905–1974)  Koallah (1924–1978)  Larralea (1902–1928 Taaraak)   Leslie Manor (1924–1970 Coradjil)  Lismore (Gnarkeet, Gnarpurt, Struan)  Mingay (1914–1927)  Mount Bute (1923–1954)  Naroghid (1875–1964 Marida Yallock)  Newfield (1892–1964)  Noorat (Mount Noorat, Koonendah Railway Station (in Moyne Shire))  Noorat East   Paaratte (1938–1972 Paaratte Corner)  Peterborough (1890– )  Pomborneit (1868–1982)  Pomborneit East (1937–1969)  Pomborneit North (1910–1977)  Port Campbell (Port Campbell West)  Princetown (1859–1988 Princeton, Rivernook House)  Purrumbete South (Tandarook South)  Scotts Creek (1879–2000)  Simpson (1962– )  Skibo  Skipton  Stonyford (1866–1980 Stoneyford)  Tandarook (1921–1956)  Terang (Keilambete, Keilambete East)  Tesbury (1921–1944 Talindert) Timboon  Timboon West   Vite Vite (1914–1953)  Vite Vite North (1923–1950)  Waarre  Wattle Hill (1947)  Weerite (1891–1974 Purrumbeet North, Wiridjil)

Shire of Colac Otway

Aire Valley (1912–1919 Aire, see Glenaire)  Alvie  Apollo Bay (Krambruk, Middleton, Krambruk North, Blanket Bay Saw Mill, Killala)  Balintore (1922–1959)  Barongarook (1887–1974 Barongarook East, Coram)  Barongarook West (1947–1971)  Barramunga (1887–1981 Olangolah East, Olangolah)  Barwon Downs (1888–1975)  Beeac (Ondit, Salt Works)  Beech Forest (McDevitt's, Wimba, Harrison's, Websters Hill, Wellesley)  Birregurra (Mount Gellibrand, Ricketts Marsh, Armytage)  Bungador (1925–1970)  Cape Otway (1880–1972 Cape Horn, Parker River)  Carlisle River (1901–2000 Charley's Creek)  Chapple Vale (1906–1971 Chapple Creek, Barwongemoong West, Devondale)  Colac (Lake Colac)  Colac East (1910–1983)  Colac West (1902– )  Coragulac (1924–1974)  Cororooke (1887– Cororooke South)  Corunnun (1920–1980) Cressy  Cundare (1886–1903)  Cundare North (1911–1969 North Cundare)  Dreeite (1912–1971 Corangamite, North Dreeite)  Dreeite South (1925–1934)   Elliminyt (1879–1993 Tulloh)  Eurack (1905–1961 Eurack Creamery)  Ferguson (1919–1951 Dinmont)  Forrest (Yaugher)  Gellibrand (1898– Banool, Baldwin's, Gellibrand River, Upper Gellibrand, Lovat, Loves River)  Gerangamete (1879–1969)  Glenaire (1912–1988 Aire)  Grey River  Hordern Vale (1912–1956 Calder River)  Irrewarra (1880–1973 Ondit Road, Nawallah)  Irrewillipe (1874–1959)  Irrewillipe East (1879–1959 Tomahawk Creek)  Johanna (Johanna Heights, Graham Junction)  Kawarren (1906–1974 Kawarren East)  Kennett River  Larpent (1861–1964)  Lavers Hill (Lavers Hill South, Barwongemoong, Crowes, Stalker)  Marengo  Mount Sabine (1907–1939)  Murroon (1870–1960)  Nalangil (1902–1967 Cororooke West)  Ombersley (1884–1963 Mount Hesse)  Ondit (1908–1971 and see Beeac)  Petticoat Creek  Pirron Yallock (1872–1973 Pirron Yaloak, Pirron Yalloak)  Separation Creek (see Wye River)   Skenes Creek (1890–1971)  Skenes Creek North (1920–1960 Biddles)  Sugarloaf (1902–1930)  Swan Marsh (1904– Pirron Yallock Creamery)  Tanybryn (1915–1970)  Warncoort (1892–1970)  Warrion (Bullock Swamp)  Weeaproinah (1900–1967 Weeaproniah, Pile Siding)  Weering (1882–1958)  Whoorel (1910–1969)  Wingeel   Wongarra (1912–1971 Cape Patton)  Wool Wool (1921–1971)  Wye River (Separation Creek)  Wyelangta (1912–1969 Kincaid, Kincaid Siding)  Yeo  Yeodene (1926–1971)  Yuulong (1906–1972 Colac Tree, Wangerrip, Wangerrip Factory)

Surf Coast Shire

Aireys Inlet  Anglesea (Swampy Creek, Point Roadknight)   Bambra (1892–1973)  Barrabool (1892–1973)  Bellbrae  Bells Beach  Benwerrin (1886–1927 Wymbooliel)  Big Hill (1860–1922 Big Hill Creek)  Boonah (1887–1929)  Buckley (1870–1970 Buckley's Road, Modewarre Railway Station, Lake Town Railway Station)  Deans Marsh (Yan Yan Gurt)  Eastern View (1924–1967 Memorial Arch)  Fairhaven (1911–1957)  Freshwater Creek (1860–1961)  Gherang (Gherang Military)  Gnarwarre (1857–1963)  Jan Juc  Lorne (Lorne North, Split Point Lighthouse, Allenvale, Cumberland Creek, Cumberland Valley, Little Colac, Sheoak)  Modewarre (1859–1967)  Moggs Creek  Moriac  Mount Duneed (1860–1959 Connewarre, Puelba)  Mount Moriac (1854–1978 Duneed)  Paraparap (1910–1955)  Pennyroyal (1887–1955 Pennyroyal Creek)  Torquay (Spring Creek, Ocean Views, Wombah Park, Zeally Bay)  Wensleydale (Sokel)  Winchelsea (Armytage, Barwon, Ingleby)  Winchelsea South  Wurdiboluc (1866–1966 Wordieboluc)

City of Greater Geelong

Suburbs of Geelong
Bell Park (Separation Street)  Bell Post Hill  Belmont  Breakwater  Corio (Cowies Creek, Rosewall)   Drumcondra  Geelong  East Geelong  North Geelong (Geelong North)  South Geelong  Geelong West (Ashby, Little Scotland, Kildare, Shandeen, Western Heights)  Grovedale (Germantown, Grovedale East)  Hamlyn Heights (Vines Road)  Herne Hill  Highton (Montpellier, Highton South)  Lara (Lara Lake, Flinders Peak)  Leopold (Kensington, Kensington Hill, Leopold Hill)   Lovely Banks (Lovely Banks Reservoir)  Manifold Heights (Manifold, Minerva)  Marshall (Marshalltown)  Moolap (Point Henry, Moolap West)  Mount Duneed  Newcomb  Newtown (Bareena, Chilwell, Marnock Vale)  Norlane (Norlane West)  North Shore  Rippleside  St Albans Park  Thomson  Wandana Heights  Waurn Ponds (Pettavel)  Whittington

Towns and localities
Anakie (Anakie East)  Avalon  Balliang  Barwon Heads (Connewarre East)  Batesford (Hopeton)  Bellarine (Port Bellarine)  Breamlea (Thompsons Creek)  Ceres  Clifton Springs (Fairy Dell)  Connewarre  Curlewis  Drysdale (McLeod's Waterholes, Bellarine, Murrudoc, Murradoc)  Fyansford (Buckley's Falls)   Indented Head 
Little River (Cocoroc Rivulet, Rothwell)  Mannerim  Marcus Hill  Moorabool   Ocean Grove (Collendina)  Point Wilson  Portarlington (Port Arlington)  St Leonards  Staughton Vale (Anakie Junction)  Swan Bay  Wallington

Borough of Queenscliffe

Point Lonsdale  Queenscliff (Queenscliff Lookout, Whale Head, Shortland's Bluff)   Swan Island

Shire of Moorabool

Bacchus Marsh  Ballan (Bradshaw's Creek, Bradshaw)  Balliang (Mount Rothwell, Ripley Ford (in Greater Geelong) )   Balliang East (1911–1958)  Barkstead (1869–1972)  Barrys Reef (1866–1956)  Beremboke (1877–1968)  Blackwood (Mount Blackwood, Golden Point, Simmons' Reef)  Blakeville (1871–1964 Ballanee)  Bolwarrah (1867–1971 Devil's Creek, Bolwarra)  Bullarook (1861–1973)  Bullarto South (1884–1974)  Bunding (1886–1969)  Bungal (Ballark)  Bungaree  Cargerie (1868–1930 Cargarie)  Clarendon (1857–1976 Corduroy Bridge)  Claretown (1902–1963)  Clarkes Hill (1872–1968)  Coimadai (1867–1969 Coimadai Creek)  Colbrook (1889–1932)  Dales Creek  Darley (1940–1946 Darley Military)  Dunnstown (Dunn's Town)  Elaine  Fiskville (Yaloak)  Glenmore (Yaloak Vale)  Gordon (Gordon's, Ormond)  Greendale  Grenville (1886–1963)  Hopetoun Park  Ingliston (1890–1954 Darriwell, Bungletap)  Korobeit (1891–1961)  Korweinguboora (1878–1972 Paddy Point)  Lal Lal  Leigh Creek (1865–1979)  Lerderderg  Long Forest  Maddingley  Merrimu  Millbrook (1868–1985 Moorabool Creek)  Morrisons (1859–1953 Morrison's Diggings, Riverside, Morrison, Upper Morrison, Dolly's Creek, Dolly's Diggings)  Mount Doran (1859–1930 see Elaine)  Mount Egerton  Mount Wallace (1871–1965)  Myrniong  (Pyke's Creek, Pykes Creek Reservoir)  Navigators (1889–1976)  Parwan  Pentland Hills (1858–1872 see Myrniong)  Pootilla (1878–1971)  Rowsley (1890–1962)  Spargo Creek (1902–1970)  Springbank (1875–1966)  Wallace  Wattle Flat (1902–1962)  Yendon (R1862–1978 Buninyong Railway Station)

Shire of Macedon Ranges

Ashbourne (Campaspe)  Baynton  Baynton East  Benloch (1920–1952)  Bolinda  Bullengarook (Bullengarook East)  Cadello Carlsruhe (Carlsruhe Rail)  Cherokee  Chintin (1875–1966)  Clarkefield (Lancefield Junction, Lancefield Road)  Cobaw  Darraweit Guim  Edgecombe (1877–1966)  Fern Hill (1909–1976 Fernhill)  Gisborne (Bush Inn)  Gisborne South (1867–1965 Cabbage Tree, Yangardook, Couangalt)   Glenhope (1882–1952 Glenhope East)  Goldie (1870–1884 Goldie North)  Greenhill (1861–1962 Green Hills, Green Hill)  Hanging Rock  Hesket  Kerrie  Kyneton (Boggy Creek, Bald Hill, Woodleigh Heights)  Kyneton South (1918–1921 Coliban Upper)  Lancefield (Five Mile Creek)  Lauriston (Redesdale Junction)  Macedon (Black Forest)  Malmsbury (Malmesbury)  Monegeetta (Duck Holes, Monegatta, Monegeeta, Monegatta South, North Monegeeta, North Monegeetta)  Mount Macedon (Macedon Upper, Barringo)  New Gisborne   Newham (Hieland Town, Isle of Skye)  Pastoria (1868–1898)  Pastoria East (1902–1966)  Pipers Creek (1886–1964)  Riddells Creek (Riddell)  Rochford (Monument Creek, Whan's)  Romsey (Bolinda Vale, Tickawarra)  Sidonia (1899–1965)  Spring Hill (1862–1968)  Springfield  Tantaraboo (1878–1965)  Trentham East (1871–1976 East Trentham)  Tylden (Coliban Reservoir)  Woodend  Woodend North (1884–1958)

Shire of Murrindindi

Acheron (Acheron Lower)  Alexandra (Red Gate Diggings, Redgate)  Buxton  Castella (1918–1965)  Cathkin  Caveat (1911–1930)  Cheviot (Ross Creek)   Devils River  Dropmore (1887–1930)  Eildon (Eildon Weir, Burnt Bridge, Nelson's Hill, Snobs Creek)  Fawcett (1885–1968)  Flowerdale (Hazeldene, Hazeldean)  Ghin Ghin (1868–1873)  Glenburn (Glenburn Creamery, Devlin Bridge)  Gobur (1869–1974 Godfrey's Creek)  Highlands (1906–1952)  Homewood (1874–1975 Doogalook, Dairy Creek)  Kanumbra (1891–1978)  Kerrisdale (1884–1977)  Killingworth  Kinglake (Kinglake East, Mountain Rush)  Kinglake Central  Kinglake West  Koriella (1891–1968 Alexandra Road, Rhodes)  Limestone  Maintongoon  Marysville (Wilks Creek)  Molesworth  Murrindindi (1885–1973 Woodbourne)  Narbethong (Dunholm, St Fillan's, The Hermitage, The Hermitage (Black Spur), Granton)  Pheasant Creek (1902– )  Rubicon (1926–1964 Torbreck Station)  Strath Creek  Taggerty (Acheron Upper)   Taylor Bay  Terip Terip (1881–1941)  Thornton (1866– )  Toolangi  Yarck  Yea (Muddy Creek)

Shire of Mitchell
'

Beveridge  Broadford  Bylands (1880–1994)  Clonbinane (Wall Crossing)  Forbes (1874–1918)  Glenaroua (1877–1963 Glenaroua Upper)  Glenhope (1882–1952)  Glenhope East (1902–1931)  Heathcote Junction  Heathcote South (1917–1974)  High Camp  Hilldene (1913–1916)  Kilmore  Kilmore East (Gavan Duffy, Cameron's Creek State School)  Kobyboyn (1884–1915)  Moranding (1890–1957 Ghera)  Northwood (1878–1942)  Nulla Vale (1877–1945 Emu Flat)  Puckapunyal (1878– Puckapunyal North, Puckapunyal Town, Puckapunyal Military, Major's Line, Mitchell's Creek, Shepherd's Creek)  Pyalong  Reedy Creek (1859–1965)  Seymour (Seymour South)  Sugarloaf Creek (1902–1930 Ahearn's (Sugarloaf Creek))  Sunday Creek (Coulson Crossing)  Tallarook (Dysart, Dysart Siding)  Tooborac  Trawool (1886–1972 Granite)  Tyaak (1861–1947 Lower Crossing)  Upper Plenty (1902–1974 Yabamac)  Wallan (Wallan Wallan, Wallan Wallan East, Wallan East)  Wandong  Waterford Park  Whiteheads Creek (1890–1930 Burlington)  Willowmavin (1891–1957)

Bass Coast Shire

Adams Estate  Almurta (Almurta East)   Anderson (1936–1971)  Archies Creek  Bass  Cape Paterson    Cape Woolamai (Woolamai, Woolamai Waters, Woolamai Waters West)   Churchill Island    Corinella (1860– )  Coronet Bay (1969–1975)  Cowes (Cowes East, Cowes West)   Dalyston (1904– Hicksborough, Dudley)  Dudley South (1912–1977)  Glen Alvie (1890–1977 Jumbunna, Korrine)  Glen Forbes (1902–1994 Mann's, Kernot)  Grantville (1875– )  Harmers Haven   Inverloch (Anderson's Inlet)  Jam Jerrup   Kernot (1911– see Glen Forbes)  Kilcunda (Bridge Creek)  Krowera (1889–1968 Bass Valley)  Lance Creek (1915–1937)  Lang Lang (Lang Lang West)  Loch (1887– )  Newhaven  Pioneer Bay  Powlett River (1874–1956)  Queensferry (1874–1934)  Rhyll    Ryanston (1891–1954 Balmattum, Balmattum East, Blackwood Forest)  San Remo (Griffith's Point, Goodhurst)   Silverleaves  Smiths Beach  St Clair (1910–1918 see Wonthaggi)  Summerlands  Sunderland Bay  Sunset Strip  Surf Beach   Tenby Point  The Gurdies   Ventnor (1915–1944 Beachcomber Estate)  Wattle Bank (1920–1930 Wattlebank)  West Creek (1871–1958 Powlett River)  Wimbledon Heights    Wonthaggi (Powlett Coal Mine, St Clair)     Wonthaggi North (1912–1969 North Wonthaggi)  Woodleigh (1896–1980 Woodleigh Vale, St Helier, Fern Hill)  Woolamai (1859–1965 Milndale, Milne's and see Cape Woolamai)

South Gippsland Shire

Agnes (Barry Beach)  Allambee South  Arawata (1891–1957)  Baromi (1886–1892 see Mirboo North)  Bena (R1887-2003 Kilcunda Road)  Bennison (1890–1962 Liverpool, Franklin River)  Berrys Creek (1924–1925 Mount Vernon)  Boolarong (1907–1970 Boolarong South)  Boolarra South (1915–1919)  Boorool  Buffalo (1892– Buffalo Creek)  Delburn (1902–1966 Darlimurla, Morrell's Hill)  Darby River  Dollar (1902–1971 Carmichael)  Dumbalk (1890– Woorayl)  Dumbalk North (1907–1944 Milford Grange, Fidges, Milford)  Fairbank (1888–1930)  Fish Creek (Boys, Hoddle Range, Hoddle, O'Gradys Ridge)  Foster (Stockyard Creek, Cypress Grove, Golden Creek, Henwoods, Corner Inlet, Amery's Track, Amey's Track)  Foster North (1914–1960 Grassy Spur, Tannahills)  Gunyah (1904–1942 Gunyah Gunyah, Gunyah Junction, Olsen's Bridge)  Hallston (1927–1955)  Hazel Park (1922–1959)  Hedley (1892–1994 Hodgkinson)  Inverloch (Andersons Inlet)  Jeetho (1884–1951 Jeetho Valley, Horner)  Jumbunna   Kardella (1892–1977)  Kardella South (1922–1946)  Kongwak (Burndale, Ellerside)  Koonwarra (1890– )  Koorooman (1887–1939 Kooraman State School, Koorooman East, and see Leongatha)  Korumburra (Glentress)  Korumburra South (1914–1928)  Leongatha  Leongatha North (1906–1950 Wooreen)  Leongatha South (1902–1947)  Mardan (1885–1941 Mardan South, Glen Mona)  Meeniyan  Middle Tarwin (1925–1972)  Mirboo (1879–1971 East Tarwin, Tarwin East, Riverview see Mirboo North)  Mirboo East  Mirboo North (Mirboo Central, Mirboo South, Dickies Hill Junction)  Mount Best (1904–1970 Devils Pinch, Mount Fatigue)  Mount Eccles (1890–1951 Geachville)  Mount Eccles South  Moyarra (1884–1921 Jumbunna East)  Nerrena (1909–1948 Nerrena East)  Nyora (Lang Lang East)  Outtrim (1894–1957 Outtrim South)  Poowong (Abshott)  Poowong East (1886–1916 Cruickston)  Poowong North (1884–1957)  Port Franklin (Bowen)  Port Welshpool (1910–1994)  Pound Creek (1892–1955)   Ranceby  Ruby (1892–1974)  Sandy Point  Stony Creek (Fish Creek North, Rumbug)  Strzelecki (1902–1953 Jensen's, Strezelecki, Strezleckie, Seabrook)  Tarwin (1879–1881 see Mirboo North)  Tarwin Lower (Tarwin Meadows, Lake Tutegong, Liptrap)  Tidal River (1954–1993 Tidal River Camp)  Toora   Toora North (1915–1952 Attercliffe)  Turtons Creek (1904–1966)  Venus Bay  Walkerville (Waratah Bay, Promontory View, Walkerville North)  Walkerville South  Waratah Bay (Waratah North see Walkerville)  Welshpool (1859– Granite Bar)  Whitelaw (1891–1961)  Wild Dog Valley  Wilsons Promontory (1873–1951 Darby)  Wonga (1921–1966 Bonnie Brae, Wonga Wonga)  Woorarra East (1902–1970 Woorarra)  Woorarra West (1904–1947)  Yanakie (Yanakie South, Shallow Inlet)

Shire of Baw Baw

Aberfeldy (Mount Lookout)  Ada (Mount Ada)  Allambee (1883–1955)  Allambee Reserve  Amor  Athlone (Lindermann's)  Baw Baw (1909–1968 Kelly's, Holmedale, Beardmores, Beardmore)  Baw Baw Village  Bona Vista (1909–1948)  Boola (1885–1912 Brunton, Conference Corner)  Brandy Creek (1902–1958 see Drouin)  Bravington  Buln Buln (Brandy Creek, and see Drouin)  Buln Buln East (1882–1962 Drouin North)  Caringal (1938–1960 Tyers Junction, Saxton)  Childers (1879–1972)  Cloverlea (1914–1946)  Coalville (1888–1960)  Coopers Creek (1868–1953 Jubilee and see Walhalla)  Crossover (1866–1964 Crossover Diggings)  Darlimurla (1880–1968)  Darnum  Drouin (Robin Hood)  Drouin East   Drouin South (1881–1973)  Drouin West (1876–1976 Jindivick, Whiskey Creek)  Ellinbank (1879–1948 Torwood)  Erica (Harris, Parkers Corner, Upper Moondarra, Telbit Crossing)   Ferndale (1902–1933)  Fumina (1902–1967 Fumina Settlement, North Fumina)  Fumina South (Duggan, Russell's Creek, Tangil)  Gainsborough (1891–1946)  Gentle Annie (1926–1947 Nayook West, Whites Corner)  Hallora (1902–1963 Topiram, Warneet)  Heath Hill (1883–1962)  Hill End (1900–1981 Hillend)  Icy Creek  Jacob Creek  Jericho (1865–1939 Red Jacket, Alhambra, Roberts, Saint Clair, The Oaks, The Springs)  Jindivick (1888–1964 Tarago, Jindivick North, Jindivick West and see Drouin)  Labertouche (1887–1956)  Lardner (1878–1961)  Lillico  Loch Valley (1913–1942)  Longwarry (Longwarry East)   Longwarry North (1927–1957)  Mirboo South (1885–1904 Russell's)  Modella (1904–1963)  Moondarra (1883–1972 Moondarra Reservoir, Gould, Collins Siding, Watson)  Mountain View (1901–1959 Triholm)  Narracan (1877–1974 Narracan Railway Township, Narracan East, Narracan South)  Nayook (1953–1976)  Neerim   Neerim East (1902–1964 Bosworth, Rosworth)  Neerim Junction (1907–1994)  Neerim North (Barr's)  Neerim South   Nilma (Bloomfield)  Noojee (Capuano, Horsfal, Kanawha, Pangorang, Quongup, Twelftrees, Hayman Corner)  Nilma North (1905–1906 McDonald's Track)  Piedmont (1902–1903)   Rawson  Ripplebrook (1881–1962 Longwarry South, Remington see Longwarry)  Rokeby  Seaview (1891–1960)  Shady Creek (1871–1955)  Tanjil (Old Tanjil, Palmer, Western Tyers)  Tanjil Bren (Millswyn, Downey, Kirchubel, Newlands, Strahan)  Tanjil South (1915–1954 Tangil South)  Tetoora Road (1915–1947)  Thaloo   Thomson (Sullivans, Swingler, The Junction, Toner)  Thorpdale (Narracan West)  Thorpdale South (1888–1968 see Thorpdale)  Toombon (1862–1923 Donnelly's Creek, McGuire, O'Keefe)  Toorongo (1922–1923 Toorongo Falls, Toorongo Valley)  Trafalgar (Trafalgar West, Yalungah)  Trafalgar East (1908–1950 Moe Swamp East)  Trafalgar South (1917–1923)  Trida (1902–1930 Arminda)   Vesper (1910–1961 Tooronga)  Walhalla (Cooper's Creek, Happy-Go-Lucky, Happy Go Lucky, Knott's Siding, Ezard's Mills, Maiden Town, Mormon Town, Stringer's Creek, Western)  Warragul (Warragul Heights, Berrinba)  Warragul South (1905–1909 Bull Swamp)  Warragul West   Westbury  Willow Grove  Yarragon (Waterloo, Waterloo South)  Yarragon South (1902–1956 Chesterfield's, Allambee East)

Latrobe City

Balook (1903–1965 Valley View)  Boolarra  Boolarra South (1914–1946 Limonite, Darragh's)  Budgeree (1910–1943 Budgeree East, Hood's, Livingston)  Callignee (Le Roy)  Churchill  Driffield (1902–1940 Ten Mile Creek)  Glengarry (La Trobe)  Glengarry North   Glengarry West   Grand Ridge (1910–1936 Johnstones Hill (Wellington Shire) Gemmell's Hill, English Corner, Valley View)  Hazelwood (1877–1893)  Hazelwood North  Hazelwood South  Hernes Oak (1934–1974 Haunted Hills)  Jeeralang (Jeeralang State School, Jeeralang North)  Jeeralang Junction (1915–1975)  Jumbuk (1902–1965 Jumbuk East, Mayflower, Roy's)  Koornalla (1906–1966 Upper Traralgon Creek)  Loy Yang (1887–1944)  Maryvale (1904–1958 Kowree, Derham's Hill)  Mid Valley (1983– )  Moe (The Mowie)  Moe South (1881–1892)  Morwell (Godridge, Morwell Bridge, Morwell North, Morwell West)  Mount Tassie   Newborough (Newborough East, Newborough North)  Toongabbie  Traralgon (Cumberland Park, Pax Hill)  Traralgon East (1882–1971 Flynn's Creek Upper, Flynn Upper)  Traralgon South (1889–1952)  Tyers (Boola Boola)  Yallourn (Yallourn Railway Camp, Eastern Camp, Western Camp, Yallourn Heights)   Yallourn North (Brown Coal Mine)  Yinnar  Yinnar South

Shire of Wellington

Airly (1924–1950)  Alberton  Alberton West  Arbuckle  Billabong  Binginwarri (1902–1968 Binginwarrie, Adare )  Blackwarry (1892–1967)  Boisdale  Briagolong (Culloden, Freestone Creek)  Budgee Budgee  Bundalaguah (1892–1974)  Buragwonduc  Bushy Park    Callignee North (1902–1966 Beards)  Callignee South (1902–1930)  Calrossie  Carrajung  Carrajung Lower (1902–1969 Bruthen Creek)  Carrajung South (1916–1931)  Cherrilong (1924–1957)  Clydebank (1873–1949)  Cobains (1927–1950)  Coongulla  Cowa (1865–1916 Grant, Grant Junction, Bull Town, Peter The Swede)  Cowwarr (Upper Heyfield, Cowwar, Cowwarr Weir, Swing Bridge)   Crookayan  Crooked River (1862–1865) (Gibbs, Shepherdson)  Dargo (Dargo Flat, Dargo High Plains, Dogs Grave, Hustlers, Mayford,  Riverford, Waterford, White Timber)  Darriman (1884–1968 Mullundung)  Dawson (1884–1958 Glenmaggie Railway Station)  Denison (1902–1925 Acre, Denison West, Velore)  Devon North (1891–1979 Kallady, Eilandonan, Glen Rose)  Dutson (1889–1927)  Dutson Downs  Flamingo Beach  Flynn (1880–1968 Flinnstead, Flynn's Creek Railway Station)  Flynns Creek (1872–1948)  Fulham (1890–1974)  Gelliondale (1907–1974)   Giffard (1900–1955)  Giffard West (1902–1907)  Gillum  Glen Falloch (1912–1914 Glenfalloch, see Licola)  Glenmaggie (Glenmaggie Weir, Glenmaggie Point, Store Point, The Springs)  Glomar Beach  Golden Beach  Gormandale (1887– )  Greenmount  Hawkhurst (1924–1964 Black Snake Creek, Maguires)  Hedley (1908–1994)  Heyfield (Hayfield)  Hiamdale (1890–1895 Timbs Crossing, Hiamdall)  Hiawatha (1913–1968)  Hollands Landing (1913–1928)  Howitt Plains  Hunterston (1925–1967)  Jack River (1892–1963 Jack's Corner, Tooloonook)  Kilmany (1909–1973 Nambrok South, Kilmany South)  Koorool (Morgan)  Lake Wellington  Langsborough  Licola  Licola North (1910–1960 Glencairn)  Llowalong (1924–1944)  Loch Sport  Longford (Holey Plain South, La Trobe Bridge)  Macks Creek (1865–1974 Kevington)  Madalya (1902–1968 Ward's, Nestor)  Maffra (Sheepfold)    Maffra West Upper (Upper Maffra West)  Manns Beach  McLoughlins Beach  Meerlieu (1882–1964 Meerlieu West)  Miowera  Monomak (Bulldog Junction, Huggett Lookout)  Montgomery  Moornapa (1940–1973 Castleburn, Bulgaback Creek)  Moroka  Munro (1888–1976)  Myrtlebank (1902–1967)  Nambrok (1909–1971 Nambrok West)  Nap Nap Marra  Newry (Upper Maffra, Maffra Upper, Bellbird Corner)  Nuntin  Ocean Grange  Paradise Beach (1963–1974)  Pearsondale (1928–1930)  Perry Bridge (1879–1956)  Port Albert (Alberton, Sunday Island)   Reynard  Riverslea  Robertsons Beach  Rosedale   Sale (Flooding Creek, Guthridge)   Sale East (1943– Sale East R.A.A.F.)  Sargood  Seacombe (1888–1928 Booran)  Seaspray (1915– )  Seaton (Bald Hills (Gippsland))  Snake Island  Staceys Bridge (1903–1967)  Stockdale (1902–1968)  Stradbroke (1875–1969 Stradbrook, Merriman's Creek, Stradbroke West)  Stratford (Leebrooke)    Tamboritha  Tarra Valley (1907–1968 Womerah)  Tarraville (1854–1975)  The Heart (1886–1951)  The Honeysuckles   Tinamba (Mewburn Park)   Tinamba West (1902–1956 Blore)  Toolome  Toora North (1915–1930)  Valencia Creek   Walhalla East  Willung (1880–1956)  Willung South (1902–1971)  Winnindoo (1925–1967)  Won Wron (1887–1974 Napier)  Wongungarra  (1865–1948 Talbotville, Winchester, Howittville, Hogtown, Naarun, Treasure)    Wonyip (1907–1968 (Christies, Proctors , Ryton)  Woodside (Woodside East, Balloong, Baloong)  Woodside Beach  Woodside North  Woolenook (Blomford)  Worrowing  Wrathung (1890)  Wrixen  Wurruk (1867–1977 Wurruk Wurruk)  Yangoura (1864–1875 Edward's Reef, Binns, Dawes, Edwards Hill, Murderers Hill, Porters)  Yarram (Yarram Yarram, Woranga, Greenmount)

Shire of East Gippsland

Allenvale, Victoria  Anglers Rest (1914–1922 Blue Duck)  Bairnsdale (Bairnsdale West, The Ridge)  Banksia Peninsula   Bellbird Creek (1911–1919)  Bemm River  Benambra (The Brothers, Uplands)  Bendoc (1869– Clarkeville, Lower Bendoc, Bendoc North, Bendoc Upper)  Bengworden (1882–1964)  Bete Bolong (1905–1912)  Bete Bolong North   Bindi (1892–1971)  Bingo Munjie (Bingo Munjie North, Bingo)  Bonang (1874–1998 Cabanandra, Cabannandra, Dellicknora, Haydens Bog, Roaring Camp)  Boole Poole   Broadlands (1902–1968)  Brodribb River (1906–1973 Brodribb, Tabbara)  Brookville (1896–1926 Strobridge, Yahoo)  Brumby  Bruthen (Bruthen Creek, Boys, Ramrod Creek)  Buchan (Sunny Point)  Buchan South (1901–1980 Canni Creek see Buchan)  Buldah (1912–1930)  Bullumwaal (1867–1978 Boggy Creek, Bulumwaal)  Bumberrah (1916–1970)  Bundara   Butchers Ridge (1902–1967)  Cabbage Tree Creek (1915–2000 Murrungowar Lower, Tarbuck's)  Calulu (1907–1971)  Cann River  Cape Conran  Cassilis  Chandlers Creek (1913–1966 Kowat, Weeragua, Split Yard))  Clifton Creek (1913–1967 Fairhope, Ward Crossing)  Club Terrace (1896–1996 Sans Souci)  Cobbannah (1874–1934 Bulgoback, Cobbanah)  Cobberas   Cobungra (1885–1965)  Combienbar (1910–1980)  Corringle    Deddick Valley (1902–1904 Deddick,  Mount Deddick)   Delegate River ((1902–1961) Delegate River East)  Deptford (1868–1928 Purtle)  Doctors Flat (1907–1953)  Double Bridges  Eagle Point (1902–1976 Eaglepoint Village Settlement)  East Bairnsdale (1907–1979 Bairnsdale East)  Eastwood (Clifton Waters Village)  Ellaswood (1923–1966)  Ensay (Ensay South, Wattle Circle)  Ensay North (1920–1960)  Errinundra (1992–1952 Erinunderra, Murrungowar)  Fairy Dell  Fernbank (Delvine, Nindoo)   Flaggy Creek (1920–1971)  Forge Creek (1892–1964)  Gelantipy (1888–1974)  Genoa  Gipsy Point (1907–1970)  Glen Valley (1908–1973)  Glen Wills (1890–1936 Sunnyside)  Glenaladale (1907–1968 Glenaladale North, The Fingerboards, Hunter Corner)  Goon Nure (1900–1964 Victoria Lake)  Goongerah  Granite Rock  Hillside (1889–1973 Moormurng)  Hinnomunjie (1877–1974 Hinnomunjie Inn, Hinnomunjie Bridge)  Iguana Creek (1904–1968 Treasures)  Jarrahmond  Johnsonville (Claybank)  Kalimna (1902–1970)  Kalimna West (1914–1972)  Lake Bunga   Lake Tyers (1902–1971)  Lake Tyers Beach  Lakes Entrance (Cunninghame, Merrangbaur Hill)  Lindenow (1870– Coongulmerang)  Lindenow South (1888–1977  Lindenow)  Lucknow (1880–1964 and see Bairnsdale)  Mallacoota (Mallacoota East, Mallacoota West, Karbethong, Lake View, Mirrabooka)  Manorina  Maramingo Creek (Bull Ring)  Marlo  Marthavale (Jones, Kilgowers, Seldom Seen)  Melwood (1955–1971)  Merrijig (1864–1970 Delatite, Scott's, Angusvale, Timbertop, The Swamp)  Metung   Mossiface (1894–1967)  Mount Taylor  Murrindal (1902–1918 Murrindale)  Nelse  Newlands Arm   Newmerella (Neumerella, see Orbost)  Nicholson  Noorinbee (1902–1964 Cann River Settlement)  Noorinbee North (1918–1970)  Nowa Nowa (Tara, Callinans)  Nungurner (1954–1964 Emu Vale)  Nunniong  Nurran (1953–1966 Martin's Creek)  Nyerimilang (1914–1915 Nyeriminalang)  Omeo (Jim and Jack Creek)  Omeo Valley (1902–1947 James', Livingstone Valley)  Orbost (Orbost North, Sardine Creek, Sardine Creek Camp, Lochend)  Paynesville (Toonalook)  Raymond Island  Reedy Flat (1902–1964 Reedy Creek)  Ryans  Sarsfield (1873–1979)  Shannonvale (1956–1978 Shannon Valley)  Simpsons Creek (1906–1907)  Stirling (1886–1919 Haunted Stream, Upper Stirling, Dawson City, Dogtown, Forktown, Kilgowar)  Suggan Buggan (Willis)  Swan Reach (Swan Reach West)  Swifts Creek (Swifts Creek Junction, Livingstone, The Walnuts, Winter's Store, Wintersville)  Tabberabbera (1899–1950)  Tambo Crossing (1885–1971)  Tambo Upper (1889–1963 Upper Tambo, Colquhoun)  Tamboon (Cape Everard, Furnell, Tamboon South)  Timbarra (Holstons)  Tonghi Creek (1917–1945 Hilo Crossing)  Tongio (1873–1971 Nugong, Tongio West, Yapp's)  Toorloo Arm (1908–1968 Blay's)  Tostaree (1904–1968 Hospital Creek)  Tubbut  W Tree (Gillingall, Gillingal)  Wairewa (1919–1945 Upper Hospital Creek)  Wallagaraugh  Walpa (1880–1973 Burstoff's Store, Coongulmerang Upper)  Wangarabell (1902–1970 Wangrabelle)  Waterholes (1902–1920 Waterholes Creek)  Waygara (1902–1940 Tildesley)  Wentworth (Shanahan)  Wingan River (1936–1969)  Wiseleigh (1911–1987)  Wombat Creek (1863–1895)  Woodglen (1906–1957)  Wroxham (1908–1959 Wangrabelle Upper)  Wuk Wuk (1889–1907)  Wulgulmerang (1889–1971)  Wulgulmerang East  Wulgulmerang West (Phanek)  Wy Yung (1904–1974)  Yalmy (1905–1923 Jackson's Crossing)

Alpine Shire

Abbeyard  Barwidgee (1912–1957 Barwidgee Creek)   Bogong (1940–1993 Clover Dam, Clover Flat, Pretty Valley)  Bright (Morse's Creek, Dunphys Hill)   Buckland (1856–1961 Buckland Lower, Lower Buckland, Fairleys Creek, Buckland Junction, Salt Log, Upper Buckland, Upper Buckland Junction)  Buffalo River (1887–1919)  Coral Bank (1918–1968)  Dandongadale (1922–1971 Dondangadale, Buffalo River South)  Dederang    Dinner Plain (Flourbag)  Eurobin (Eurobin Falls, Noonameena)  Falls Creek (McKay Creek, Rocky Valley)   Freeburgh (1869–1969)  Gapsted (1877–1892 Palmerston Railway Station)  Germantown  Glen Creek (1902–1930)  Harrietville  Havilah (1924–1930)  Hotham Heights (1867–1867 Louisville, Brocket, Davenport Village, Loch Glen)   Kancoona  Kergunyah South (1891–1967)  Merriang (1861–1919)  Mongans Bridge (1927–1937)  Mount Beauty (No 2 Camp, No 4 Camp, No 5 Camp)  Mount Buffalo (1908–1986 Mount Buffalo Chalet, Mount Buffalo Hospice, Carlisle's Hospice, Dingo Dell)  Mount Hotham  Mudgeegonga (Mudgegonga)  Myrtleford (Buffalo Creek, Myrtle Creek)    Nug Nug  Ovens (Barwidgee Railway Station, Ovens Vale Railway Station, Ovens Vale)   Porepunkah (Rostrevor, Brookside, Lower Buckland, Buckland Lower)   Rosewhite (Rose White, Barwidgee Settlement, Happy Valley)  Running Creek (1868–1894)  Selwyn  Smoko (1908–1964)  Tawonga (Mullindolingong)    Tawonga South (1943– see Mount Beauty)  Upper Gundowring (1903–1972)  Wandiligong (1860–1994 Growler's Creek)   Wonnangatta

Shire of Towong

Bellbridge  Berringama (1890–1994 Beetoomba)  Bethanga (Bethanga Lower, Granya, Koorilla)  Biggara (1923–1965)  Bullioh (1884–1966 Bullwah, Darbyshire, Annandale)  Bungil (1902–1930)  Burrowye (1902–1969)  Colac Colac (1873–1873)  Corryong  Cudgewa (Cudgewa North, Lynette, Wabba)  Dartmouth (Banimboola, Callaghans Creek, Dark River, Gibbo, Mckay Creek)  Eskdale (Bowler, Little Snowy Creek, Penny Flat)  Georges Creek  Granya (1879–1993 see Bethanga)  Guys Forest (1923–1969)  Jarvis Creek (1924–1969 Hilisvale)  Koetong (1873–1993 Koetong Upper, Hindleton)  Lucyvale (1923–1969)  Mitta Mitta (Erinbank, Granite Flat, Snowy Creek, Mount Elmo)  Mount Alfred (1882–1975 Mount Alfred Gap)  Nariel Valley (1902–1931 Attries, Nariel, Nariel Creek, Nariel Upper, Crawford Crossing, Nariel Gap, Nariel Junction, Hodgsons Crossing, Mcnamara Crossing, The Lightwood, Willow Crossing)  Old Tallangatta (1871–1955 Tallangatta)  Pine Mountain  Shelley (1962–1969)  Talgarno (1881–1967 Talgarno West)  Tallandoon (1889–1968 Crystal Springs)  Tallangatta  (1955– Tallangatta East)  Tallangatta East (1871–1958 see Tallangatta)  Tallangatta South (1883–1967 Bolga, Bullhead Creek, Bullhead, Fairy Knowe, Fairyknowe, Fernvale, Noorongong, Wagra, Yabba)  Tallangatta Valley (1882–1974 Bucheen, Bucheen Creek, Cravensville, Mullins, The Cascade, Wyeebo, Henlow)  Thologolong  Thowgla Valley (1881–1906 Thowgla Creek, Thowgla Upper, Thowgla)  Tintaldra  Tom Groggin  Towong (Mount Elliot)  Towong Upper (1923–1965)  Walwa (Walwa Creek, Jinjellic, Walwa East)

City of Wodonga

Bandiana (Bandiana Military)   Baranduda (1923–1970)  Barnawartha North (1874–1944 North Barnawartha)  Bonegilla (Bonegilla Commonwealth Immigration Camp, Bonegilla Military, Mitta Junction, Mitta Junction Reservoir, Burrabunnia)  Castle Creek (1902–1915 Charlton's)  Ebden (1899– Bethanga Road)  Gateway Island  Hume Weir  Huon Creek   Killara   Leneva (1875–1980 Leneva West, Lone Pine)  Wodonga (Belvoir, Wodonga South, Wodonga Plaza, Birallee Park)  Wodonga West (1875–1945)

Shire of Indigo

Allans Flat  Barnawartha (Cookardinia)  Beechworth (Mayday Hills, Spring Creek, Baarmutha, Black Springs, Reids Creek, Woolshed, Domailles, Silver Creek)  Brimin (1912–1963 Dugays Bridge)  Browns Plains (1870–1970)  Bruarong (1909–1965 Glen Creek)  Carlyle (1897–1966 North Prentice, Prentice North)  Charleroi (1922–1965)  Chiltern (Doma Mungi, Upper Black Dog Creek, Black Dog Creek)  Chiltern Valley (1897–1953 Chiltern Valley No. 2 (mine))  Cornishtown (1858–1970 Indigo, Christmastown)  Gooramadda (1879–1965)  Gundowring (1877–1972 Gundowring North, Upper Gundowring)  Huon (1989– Huon Lane)  Indigo Valley (1902–1952 Barnawartha South, Indigo Upper)  Kergunyah (Kergunyah South, Beaunart)   Kiewa (1871– )  Lilliput (1907–1923 Lilliput Creamery)  Norong (1904–1968 Norong Central, Norong Creamery)  Osbornes Flat (1864–1991 Osborn's Flat)  Rutherglen (Great Northern, Great Southern (mines), Lake Moodemere,  Lake Moodemere West)  Sandy Creek (1859–1964 Tallandouring, Tallandowring,  Sandy Creek Upper, Wild Horse Hill)  Staghorn Flat (1910– )  Stanley (Yackandandah Junction, Nine Mile Creek, Hurdle Flat, Silver Creek, Twist Creek, Twist's Creek)  Tangambalanga (Red Bluff)  Wahgunyah  Yackandandah (Back Creek, Bell's Flat)

Rural City of Wangaratta

Bobinawarrah (1874–1964 Hurdle Creek, Bobinawarrah East)  Boorhaman (1862–1974 Estcourt)  Boorhaman East (1907–1964)  Boorhaman North (1892–1968)  Boralma (1890–1949)  Bowmans Forest (1861–1968 Taylor Gap, Taylor's Gap, Bowman's Forest East, Bowman Gap)  Bowser (1920–1968 Beechworth Junction)  Byawatha  Carboor (1902–1951 Carboor Upper, Carboor (Ward's), Carboor East)  Cheshunt  Cheshunt South  Docker (1915–1978 Skehan)  Dockers Plains (1865–1944 see Wangaratta North)  Edi (1875–1973 Hedi, Claremont, Hyem)  Edi Upper (1904–1965)  Eldorado (Reidford)  Everton (Brookfield)  Everton Upper (1873–1965 Everton Station, Everton Rail see Everton)  Glenrowan  Greta (Fifteen Mile Creek)  Greta South (1902–1972 Greta South Creamery)  Greta West    Hansonville (1878–1950 Hansonville South, Hanson South)  Killawarra (1879–1940)  King Valley (1905–1989 Whitfield Estate)  Laceby (1885–1930)  Londrigan (1892–1954 Carraragarmungee)  Markwood (1924–1971)  Meadow Creek (1902–1917)  Milawa (Oxley, Oxley Plains)   Moyhu (Thistlebrook, Byrne)  Murmungee (1861–1968 Hillsborough)  Myrrhee (1889–1970 Stevenson's, Willowbank, Angleside)  Oxley  Oxley Flats   Peechelba East (1928–1969)  Rose River (1950–1965 Matong, Bennies, Markous)  Springhurst (1870– Bontherambo)  Tarrawingee (1858–1961 Tarrawingee Town)  Wabonga (Top Crossing)  Waldara  Wangandary  Wangaratta (Ovens, Wangaratta West, Murdoch Road, Murdoch)  Wangaratta East  Wangaratta North (1865–1968 Docker's Plains)  Wangaratta South (1880– Yarrunga, Vincent)  Whitfield (Upper King River, Jarrott, Pieper)  Whitlands (1927–1966)  Whorouly (1866– )  Whorouly East (1924–1964)  Whorouly South (1920–1947 Kneebones Gap)

Shire of Mansfield

Ancona (Ancorna)  Barjarg (1915–1970)  Barwite (1902–1964)  Bonnie Doon (Doon,  Dry Creek, Tallangalook, Tallangallook)  Boorolite (1888–1967)  Bridge Creek (1902–1921 Wrightly, Wrightley, Tabletop)  Delatite (1872–1924 see Merrijig)  Gaffneys Creek (Lauraville, Paradise Point, Raspberry Creek, Raspberry Point, View Point)  Goughs Bay (1967– Bracks Bridge)  Howes Creek (1884–1949 Wappan)  Howqua (1902–1955 Hennessy's)  Howqua Hills (1883–1885)  Howqua Inlet  Howqua Plains   Jamieson (Jamiesons Diggings)   Kevington (Mack's Creek, Ten Mile House, Loyola, Ten Mile)  Lake Eildon (1865–1955 Darlingford)  Macs Cove  Maindample (1868–1989)  Mansfield (Mount Battery, Nillahcootie)  Matlock (Emerald Hill, Thackery, Alhambra, Mutton Town, Harpers Creek)  Merrijig (Boggy Creek, Chapel Hill, Gonzaga)  Merton  Mirimbah (1946–1974)  Mount Buller (Black River, Leviathan Reef)  Mountain Bay  Piries (1902–1942)   Sawmill Settlement  Tolmie (Wombat, Toombullup, Bunstons, Mahaikah)  Woodfield (1891–1981)  Woods Point (A1 Mine, A1 Mine Settlement, Blue Jacket, Castle Reef, Enoch's Point, Enoch Point, Gooley's Creek, Jordan, Knockwood, Burnt Camp, Drummond Point, Fiddlers Green, Pemburthy)

Rural City of Benalla

Archerton (1895–1965)  Baddaginnie  Benalla (Broken River, Kilfeera, Mokoan West, White Gate Creamery, White Gate, Karn, Yin Barun)  Boweya (1877–1963 Mokoan)  Boxwood (1890–1976)  Broken Creek (1877–1978 see Devenish)  Bungeet (1892–1967)  Bungeet West (1902–1922)  Chesney Vale (1928–1947 Chesney)  Devenish (Major Plains, Nooramunga)  Glenrowan West (1915–1947)  Goomalibee (1902–1963 Goomalibee Creamery, Blackfields, Thorley)  Goorambat (Goorambat East)  Lima (1922–1970)  Lima East (1902–1970)  Lima South (1902–1970)  Lurg (1889–1968)  Lurg Upper (1922–1968 Upper Lurg, Mason's Hill)  Major Plains  Molyullah (1902–1976 Ryan's Creek, Dodds Crossing)  Moorngag (1902–1952 Mallum, Mallum Creek)  Mount Bruno  Myrrhee (1889–1970)  Samaria (1877–1962)  Stewarton (1902–1962)  Swanpool (Swan Pool)  Taminick (1877–1891)  Tarnook (1888–1948)  Tatong  Thoona (1882– )  Upper Ryans Creek (1905–1963 Benalla Saw Mill)  Wangandary  Warrenbayne (1882–1973 Warrenbayne West)  Winton (1864–1960)  Winton North (1889–1960 Lake Mokoan)

City of Greater Shepparton

Arcadia  Ardmona (1891– )  Bunbartha (1879–1966)  Byrneside (1878– Toolamba North, Baldwinsville)  Caniambo (1882–1974)  Congupna (Congupna Road, Congupna Township)  Cooma (1882–1972)  Coomboona (1938–1993)  Cosgrove (1888–1979 Rockville, Dookie West)  Cosgrove South (1894–1962)  Dhurringile (1914–1973)  Dookie (Dookie South, Cashel)  Dookie College (1924–2001 Dookie Agricultural College)  Gillieston (1886–1965)  Girgarre East (1878–1962)  Gowangardie (1891–1967 Gowangardie East)  Grahamvale  Harston (1877–1973 Fawkner)  Invergordon South (1927–1953)  Karramomus (1882–1953 Karramomus North, Karramomus South)   Katandra (1875–1964 Khull's Range, Katandra North)  Katandra West (1927– )  Kialla  (Central Kialla, Kialla Park)  Kialla East (1878–1946)  Kialla West (1875–1951)  Kyabram South (1921–1952 Willowdene)  Lemnos   Marionvale (1902–1960 Marian Vale)   Merrigum (1875– Harrison)  Moorilim (1871–1956 Muddy Creek Bridge)  Mooroopna  Mooroopna North (1877–1973)  Mooroopna North West  Mount Major   Murchison (Warranga)  Murchison East (1882–1971 Murchison Railway Station)  Murchison North  Nalinga (1875–1963)  Orrvale (1915–1920)  Pine Lodge (1874–1983 Pine Lodge North, Pine Lodge South, Pine Lodge West and see Shepparton East)  Shepparton (McGuire's Punt, Sheppardtown, Sheppardton, Benarch, Branditt, Colliver, Dunkirk, Fraser, Shepparton Park)  Shepparton East (1902–1950 Pine Lodge)  Shepparton North  St Germains (1878–1963)  Stanhope South (1927–1961) Tallygaroopna (Tallygaroopna West, Tallygaroopna North, Karpool)  Tamleugh North (1885–1942 Tamleugh West )  Tatura  Tatura East (1927–1950 Hendersyde)   Toolamba  (Toolamba East)  Toolamba West (1876–1952)  Undera (Undera North)  Zeerust (1928–1938)

Shire of Moira

Almonds (1901–1929)  Barmah (Cummeragunga, Cummeragunja, Top Island, Barmah East, Barmah Township, Rosalind Park)  Bathumi (1878–1963)  Bearii  Boomahnoomoonah (1881–1939)  Boosey (1882–1948 Boosey North, Boosey South, Boosey West, Burramine West)  Boweya North (1888–1932 Boweya North Creamery, Yeerip)  Bundalong  Bundalong (1883–1966)  Burramine (1876–1908 Burramine East, Burramine North)  Burramine South (1882–1947)  Cobram (Boomerang)  Cobram East  Drumanure (1882–1856 see Invergordon)  Esmond (1893–1929)  Invergordon (Invergordon North, Invergordon South, Dunbulbalane, Katandra)   Kaarimba (1875–1946 Karimba)  Katamatite (Naringaningalook East)   Katamatite East  Katunga (Sandmount, Katunga East, Katunga South)  Koonoomoo  Kotupna (1881–1993 Baulkamaugh North, Yambuna, Wakiti Creek, Wakiti)  Lake Rowan (1875–1981 Calder's, Pelluebla South)  Lower Moira (1902–1953 Madowla Park)  Marungi (1879–1971)  Muckatah (1881–1920)  Mundoona (1875–1952)  Mywee (1911–1974)  Naring (1914–1915 Naringaningalook West)  Nathalia (Barwo)  Numurkah (Baulkamaugh, Baala Creek)  Peechelba (Peechelba Town, Peechelba East)  Pelluebla (1880–1993)  Picola (Barwo West, Narioka, Picola North, Tarma, Tram Island)  Picola West (1886–1971)  St James  Strathmerton (Coonanga, Strathmerton West, Corrins)  Telford  Tungamah (Hill Plain)  Ulupna (1879–1926 Ulupna Island)  Waaia (Waaia South)  Waggarandall (1879–1964 Wattville, Wattville North, Wattville South)  Wilby (1881–1978 Pelluebla East)  Wunghnu  Yabba North (1891–1967 Catotown)  Yabba South (1893–1908 Yabba Yabba, Yabba)  Yalca (1879–1957 Yalca East, Yalca North, Yalca South)  Yarrawonga (Pitman Crossing)  Yarrawonga South  Yarroweyah (Yarroweyah North, Yarroweyah South)  Yielima (1867–1963 Ulupna West, Furze's)  Youanmite (1885–1971 Youanmite West)  Youarang (1877–1952)  Yundool (1886–1990)

Shire of Strathbogie

Arcadia South (1904–1928)  Avenel  Bailieston (1865–1974 Coy's Diggings, Baillieston, Baillieston South, Baillieston East, Bailieston East, Angustown)  Balmattum (1874–1965 Balmattum East, Harry's Creek)  Boho (1893–1908 Boho Creamery)  Boho South (1902–1969)  Creek Junction (1885–1969 Too-Rour, Strathbogie North, Watson's (Strathbogie North))  Creightons Creek (1902–1937 Creighton Creek Creamery, Creighton Creek)  Earlston (1902–1955 Gowangardie South)  Euroa (Branjee, Creighton, Creighton Rail)  Gooram (1880–1956 Gooram Gong)  Goulburn Weir (1887–1974)  Graytown (1868–1972 Spring Creek)  Kelvin View (1902–1967 Mountain View)  Kirwins Bridge  Kithbrook (1921–1970 Strathbogie West)  Koonda (1888–1965)  Locksley (R1886–1973 Monea)  Longwood (Old Longwood)  Longwood East (1890–1948 see Longwood)  Mangalore (1876–1990 Mangalore West, Gravel Pits Railway Station, Gravelside (Mitchell Shire))  Marraweeny (1886–1954)  Miepoll (1881–1969 Tamleugh West)  Mitchellstown (1907–1976 Wattle Vale)  Moglonemby (1902–1968 Miepoll South)  Molka (1902–1946 Molka Creamery)  Moormbool West (1913–1969)  Nagambie (Bunganail)  Pranjip (1902–1919)  Riggs Creek (1890–1930)  Ruffy (Terip Terip)  Sheans Creek (1881–1930 Shean's Creek Creamery)  Strathbogie (Strathbogie South, Johnson's, Tames)  Tabilk (1869–1992)  Tamleugh (1881–1968)  Tarcombe (1887–1943)  Upotipotpon (Upotipotpon Station)  Upton Hill   Violet Town  Wahring (1867–1974 Dargalong)  Whroo (1857–1955)  Wirrate (1910–1952)

Unincorporated areas
Elizabeth Island  Falls Creek Alpine Resort  French Island (Tankerton, Fairhaven)  Gabo Island  Lady Julia Percy Island  Lake Mountain Alpine Resort  Mount Baw Baw Alpine Resort  Mount Buller Alpine Resort  Mount Hotham Alpine Resort  Mount Stirling Alpine Resort

See also
 Counties of Victoria
 Local government areas of Victoria
 List of regional railway stations in Victoria
 List of Melbourne suburbs
 List of places in Victoria by population

References

External links
 Victorian Railway Maps 1860 – 2000
 Victorian Places
 VICNAMES – The Register of Geographic Names

Victoria
Localities